= Napata =

Ancient Kushite city in present-day Karima, Sudan

Coordinates: 18.53°N 31.84°E

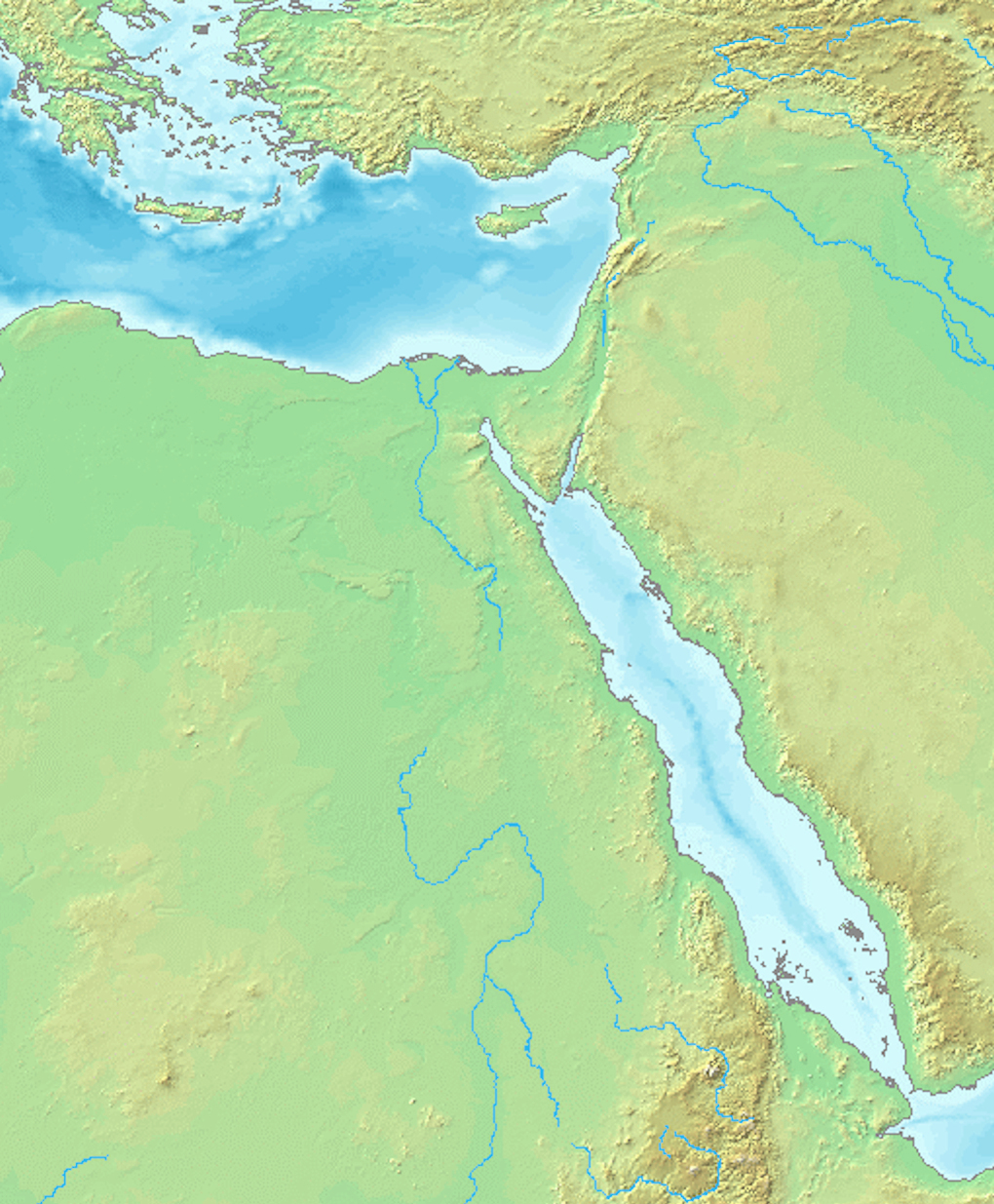
Location of Napata

Napata /ˈnæpətə/ (Ancient Egyptian: 𓈖𓐰𓊪𓐱𓏏𓌙𓐰𓈉, romanized: npt, 𓈖𓐰𓊪𓇌𓈗𓊖, npy; Meroitic: 𐦩𐦧𐦵, romanized: Napate; Ancient Greek: Νάπατα and Ναπάται) was a city of ancient Kush at the fourth cataract of the Nile founded by the Egyptian Amun cult for Egyptian pilgrims given by its, as suggested, Egyptian name. It is located approximately 1.5 kilometers from the east side of the river at the site of modern Karima, Sudan.

Napata was the southernmost permanent settlement in the New Kingdom of Egypt (16th–11th centuries BC) and home to Jebel Barkal, the main Kushite cult centre of Amun. It was the sometime capital of the Twenty-fifth Dynasty of Egypt and, after its fall in 663 BC, of the Kingdom of Kush. In 593 BC, it was sacked by the Egyptians and the Kushite capital was relocated to Meroë. Even after this move, Napata continued to be the kingdom's primary religious centre. The city was sacked a second time by the Romans in 23 BC but was rebuilt and continued as an important centre of the Amun cult.

The terms "Napata" or "Napatan period" can also refer to the Kushite polity from its rise around 750 BC until 270 BC, when Napata finally lost its symbolic significance as the location of royal burials to Meroë. The subsequent period of Kushite history is called Meroitic down to the collapse of the kingdom.

== Early history ==
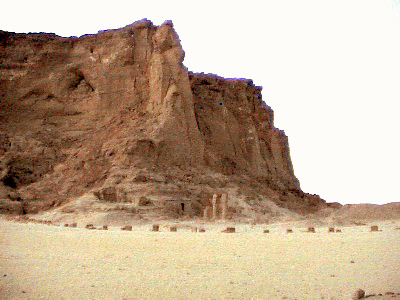
The last standing pillars of the temple of Amun at the foot of Jebel Barkal

Napata was founded by Thutmose III in the 15th century BC after his conquest of Kush. Because Egyptians believed that the inundation of the Nile equated Creation, Napata's location as the southernmost point in the empire led it to become an important religious centre and settlement. In the Early 18th Dynasty, Jebel Barkal, a lone sandstone butte, became a focus of Egyptian cultic religion as the residence of their state god Amun of Karnak. In the shadow of Jebel Barkal, a religious centre called Karnak was erected and the settlement that followed in the area became known as Napata.

In 1075 BC, the High Priest of Amun at Thebes, capital of Egypt, became powerful enough to limit the power of Pharaoh Smendes of the post-Ramesside Twenty-first Dynasty over Upper Egypt. This was the beginning of the Third Intermediate Period (1075–664 BC). The fragmentation of power in Egypt allowed the Kushites to regain autonomy as they became increasingly estranged from Theban clergy. They founded the Kingdom of Kush, which was centered at Napata. A stela erected in Napata in the eighth century presents a Kushite king (whose title has been hammered out) as the only ruler legitimated by the god Amun, appointing the kinglets and Libyan chiefs who shared Egypt at that time and derived their legitimacy from the generals' discretion.

== Napatan period ==
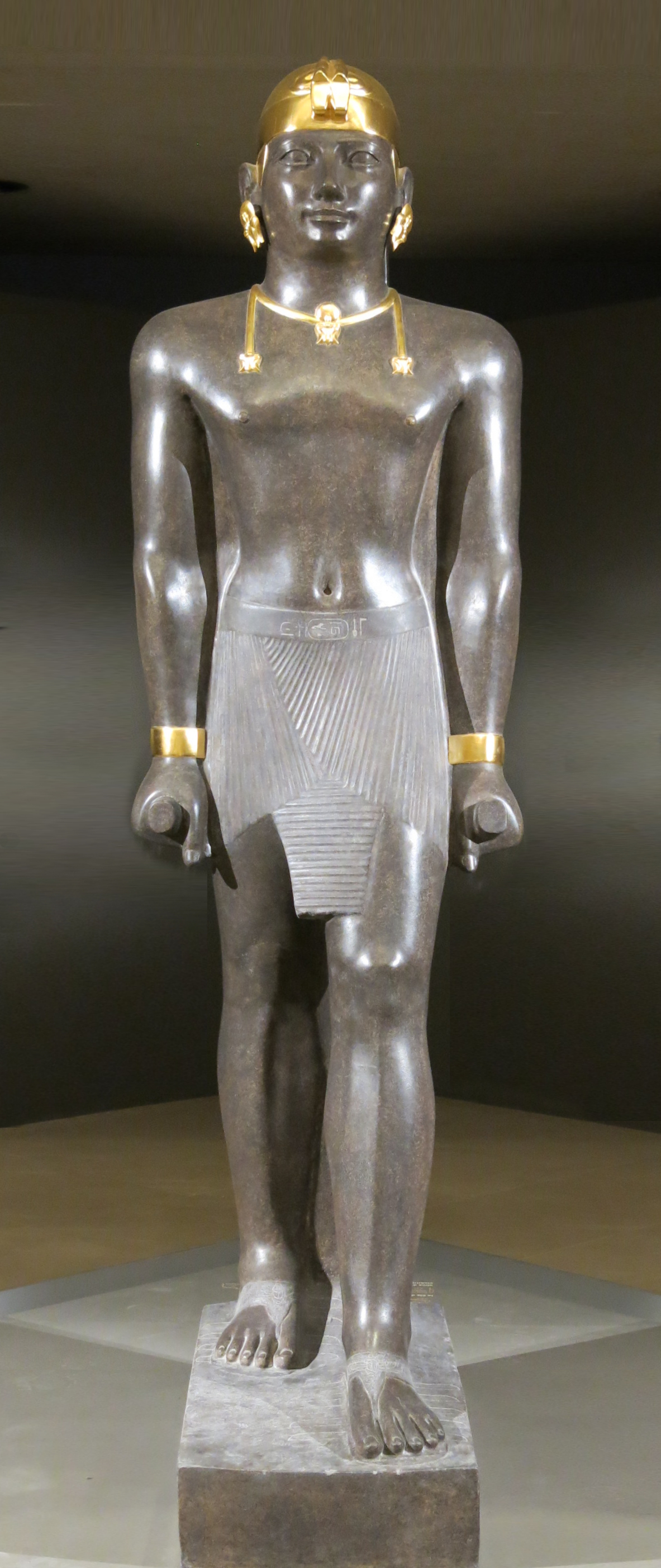
Statue of Kushite ruler and pharaoh of the 25th Dynasty of Egypt, Taharqa (ruled 690-664 BC), who led the fight against the Assyrians during the Assyrian conquest of Egypt. Louvre Museum reconstruction.

In 750 BC, Napata was a developed city, while Egypt was still suffering political instability. Kashta, whose name is Egyptian for "the Kushite", profited from it, and attacked Upper Egypt. His policy was pursued by his successors Piye, and Shabaka (721–707 BC), who eventually brought the whole Nile Valley under Kushitic control in the second year of his reign. Overall, the Kushite kings ruled Upper Egypt for approximately one century and the whole of Egypt for approximately 57 years, from 721 to 664 BC. They constitute the Twenty-fifth Dynasty in Manetho's Aegyptiaca. Furthermore, these Kushite kings were supported by Amun clergy at Thebes and believed their power was claimed through Amun of Jebel Barkal and Amun of Karnak. They are depicted in art as having worn a particular type of skull-cap crown reminiscent of the shape of Jebel Barkal, which was intended to show how they derived their power from that “Pure Mountain”.

The reunited Egyptian empire under the 25th dynasty was as large as it had been since the New Kingdom and ushered in a renaissance. Religion, arts, and architecture were restored to their Old, Middle, and New Kingdom forms. Pharaohs, such as Taharqa, built or restored temples and monuments throughout the Nile, including at Memphis, Karnak, Kawa, Jebel Barkal, and elsewhere.

=== Assyrian invasion and end of the Twenty-fifth dynasty ===
Pharaoh Taharqa's reign and that of his eventual successor, his cousin Tantamani, were filled with constant conflict with the Neo-Assyrian Empire. Around 670 BC, emperor Esarhaddon (681–669 BC) conquered Lower Egypt, but allowed local kingdoms there to exist in order to enlist them as his allies against the Kushite rulers of Upper Egypt, who had been accepted with reluctance.

When King Ashurbanipal succeeded Esarhaddon, the Kushite king Taharqa convinced some rulers of Lower Egypt to break with Assyrians. However, Assurbanipal overpowered the coalition. He appointed Necho I, ruler of Memphis and Saïs. Necho was the first king of the Twenty-sixth Dynasty (664–525 BC) of Egypt, which is also known as the "Saïte Dynasty".

In 664 BC, the Assyrians struck the final blow, sacking Thebes and Memphis. The same year, Taharqa died. The new Kushite king, Tantamani (664–653 BC), killed Necho I that same year when he tried to invade Lower Egypt. However, Tantamani was unable to defeat the Assyrians, who backed Necho's son, Psamtik I. Tantamani eventually abandoned his attempt to conquer Lower Egypt and retreated to Napata. However, his authority over Upper Egypt was acknowledged until 656 BC, when Psamtik I dispatched a naval fleet to Upper Egypt and succeeded in placing all of Egypt under his control.

The 25th dynasty ended with its rulers retreating to Napata. It was there (at El-Kurru and Nuri) that all 25th dynasty pharaohs are buried under the first pyramids that the Nile valley had seen since the Middle Kingdom.

The Napatan dynasty continued to rule the Kushite state, which flourished in Napata and Meroë until at least the second century AD.

== Late Napatan kingdom ==
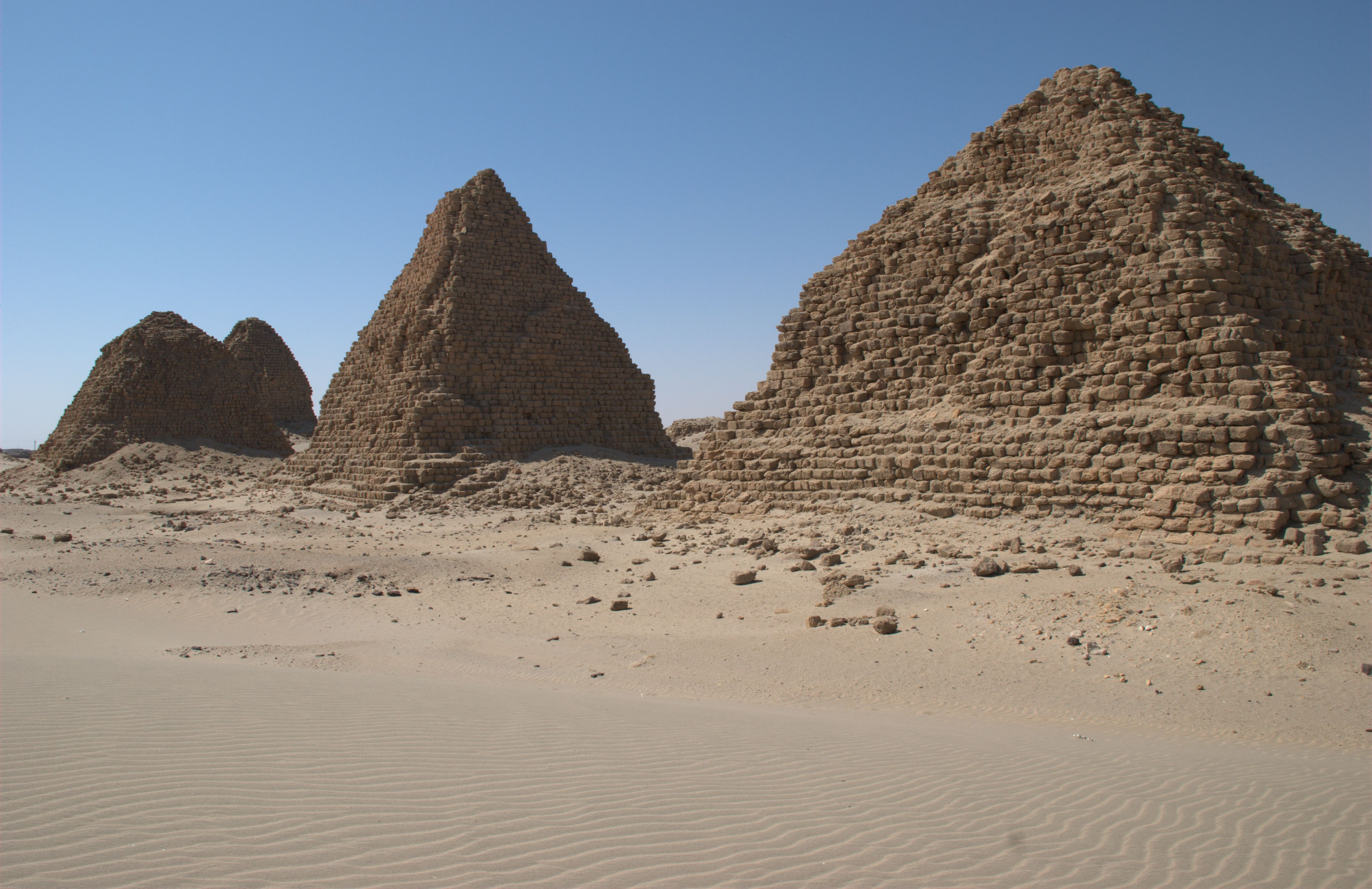
Kushite pyramids at Nuri

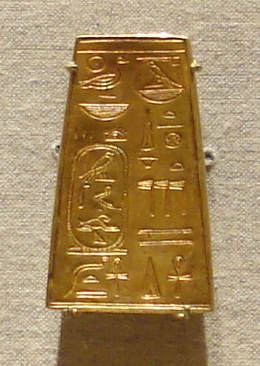
Napatan necklace spacer made of gold, 6th century BC. It is inscribed with Egyptian hieroglyphs in the name of Aramatle-qo.

Napata remained the centre of the Kingdom of Kush for another two generations, from the 650s to 590 BC. Its economy was essentially based on gold, with 26th dynasty Egypt an important economic ally.

Napatan architecture, paintings, writing script, and other artistic and cultural forms were in Kush style. Egyptian burial customs were practised, including the resurrection of pyramid building. Also, several ancient Egyptian deities were worshipped. The most important god was Amun, a Theban deity. The Temple of Amun and the Temple of Mut were the most important ones at Napata, located at the foot of Jebel Barkal.

After the Achaemenid conquest of Egypt, Napata lost its economic influence. The Napatan region itself was desiccating, leading to less cattle and agriculture. An Achaemenid raid had seriously affected Napata in 591 BC. Finally, Napata was losing its role of economic capital to Meroë. The island of Meroë, the peninsula formed by the Nile and the Atbarah River, was an area rich in iron, which was becoming an essential source of wealth. Meroe eventually became the capital of the Kingdom of Kush, leading to the abandonment of Napata.

In 23 BC, the Governor of Roman Egypt Gaius Petronius invaded Kush with 10,000 men after an initial attack by the queen of Meroë, reaching Napata. In the Res Gestae Divi Augusti ("Deeds of the Divine Augustus"), Augustus claims that "a penetration was made as far as the town of Napata, which is next to Meroe.

After the Roman attack, Napata was restored by King Natakamani, who renovated the temple of Amun and constructed a palace. Later, the site was abandoned, its buildings plundered and destroyed. There is circumstantial evidence that this may have been the result of religious changes.

== Archaeology of the site ==
The American archaeologist George A. Reisner discovered a total of ten complete (or nearly complete) statues in two caches. These statues depicted Taharqa and several of his successors, including Tanwetamani, Senkamanisken, Anlamani, and Aspelta. This discovery was partially accidental, as Reisner had only happened upon the first cache while searching for a prospective dump site. Weeks later, the second cache was found within the nearby Amun temple with several fragments matching the statues in the first cache. Along with the statue fragments, ash was found in the second cache which suggested to Reisner that the sculptures had been purposefully destroyed. Due to the close proximity, the statues from the caches are thought to have once been displayed in the Amun temple.

The earliest known standing structure at Jebel Barkal is the Enthronement Pavilion, which has been dated to the reign of Thutmose IV. This structure is adjacent to the Jebel Barkal cliff, which has resulted in several rock falls damaging the construction at various points in the third century BC and first century AD. The 18th Dynasty use for this structure is uncertain, though it is known to have functioned as a royal enthronement pavilion during the third century BC.

== Cultural references ==
Napata was mentioned in Giuseppe Verdi's opera Aida (1871) in Act III, when Amonasro uses Aida to learn where Rhadames will lead his army.

Napata is the setting for a large portion of the novel, The Last Camel Died At Noon by Egyptologist, Barbara Mertz under the pen name Elizabeth Peters.

== Bibliogrophy ==
- Reisner, George A. (1917). "The Barkal Temples in 1916, Part I". Journal of Egyptian Archaeology, 4(4), pp. 213–227.
- Reisner, George A. (1918). "The Barkal Temples in 1916, Part II". Journal of Egyptian Archaeology, 5(2), pp. 99–112.
- Dunham, Dows (1950). The Royal Cemeteries of Kush, Volume I: El Kurru. Boston: Museum of Fine Arts.
- Dunham, Dows (1955). The Royal Cemeteries of Kush, Volume II: Nuri. Boston: Museum of Fine Arts.
- Dunham, Dows (1970). The Barkal Temples. Boston: Museum of Fine Arts.
- Kendall, Timothy (1986). Gebel Barkal Epigraphic Survey: 1986. Preliminary Report of First Season's Activity. Boston: Museum of Fine Arts.
- Kendall, Timothy (1997). "Excavations at Gebel Barkal, 1996. Report of the Museum of Fine Arts, Boston, Sudan Mission". Kush, 17, pp. 320–354.
- Kendall, Timothy (1999). "The Origin of the Napatan State: El Kurru and the Evidence for Royal Ancestors". In S. Wenig (ed.), Studien zum antiken Sudan. Meroitica 15, pp. 3–117. Wiesbaden: Harrassowitz.
- Kendall, Timothy, and El-Hassan Ahmed Mohamed (2017). "Jebel Barkal in the New Kingdom: An Emerging Picture". In Neal Spencer, Anna Stevens and Michaela Binder (eds.), Nubia in the New Kingdom: Lived Experience, Pharaonic Control and Indigenous Traditions, pp. 155–188. Leuven: Peeters.
- Pope, Jeremy W. (2020). "The Napatan Period". UCLA Encyclopedia of Egyptology.
- Ciampini, Emanuele, and Francesca Iannarilli (eds.) (2022). Jebel Barkal: Half a Century of the Italian Archaeological Mission in Sudan. Rome: Gangemi.
- Emberling, Geoff, et al. (2025). "Jebel Barkal 2018–2023: New Research on the Napatan and Meroitic City". Sudan & Nubia, 28, pp. 78–98.
- Emberling, Geoff, et al. (2026). "Holocene Nile Dynamics Shaped the Physical and Cultural Landscape of Ancient Nubia". Proceedings of the National Academy of Sciences, 123(18), e2529986123.
