= Jebel Barkal =

Archaeological Site in Sudan

- جبل بركل (Arabic)
- Gebel Barkal
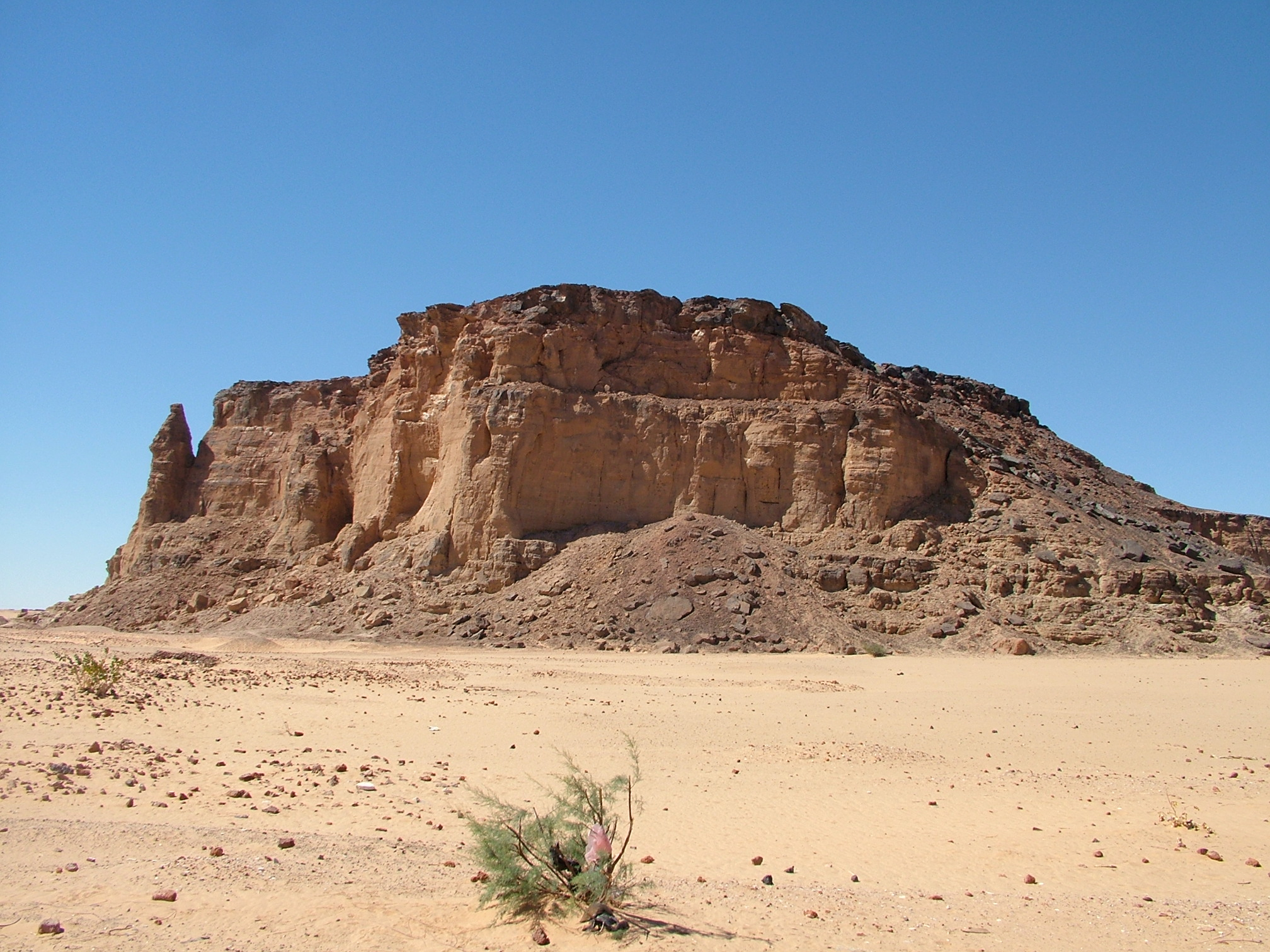
- Jebel Barkal is a small mesa (104 meters tall)

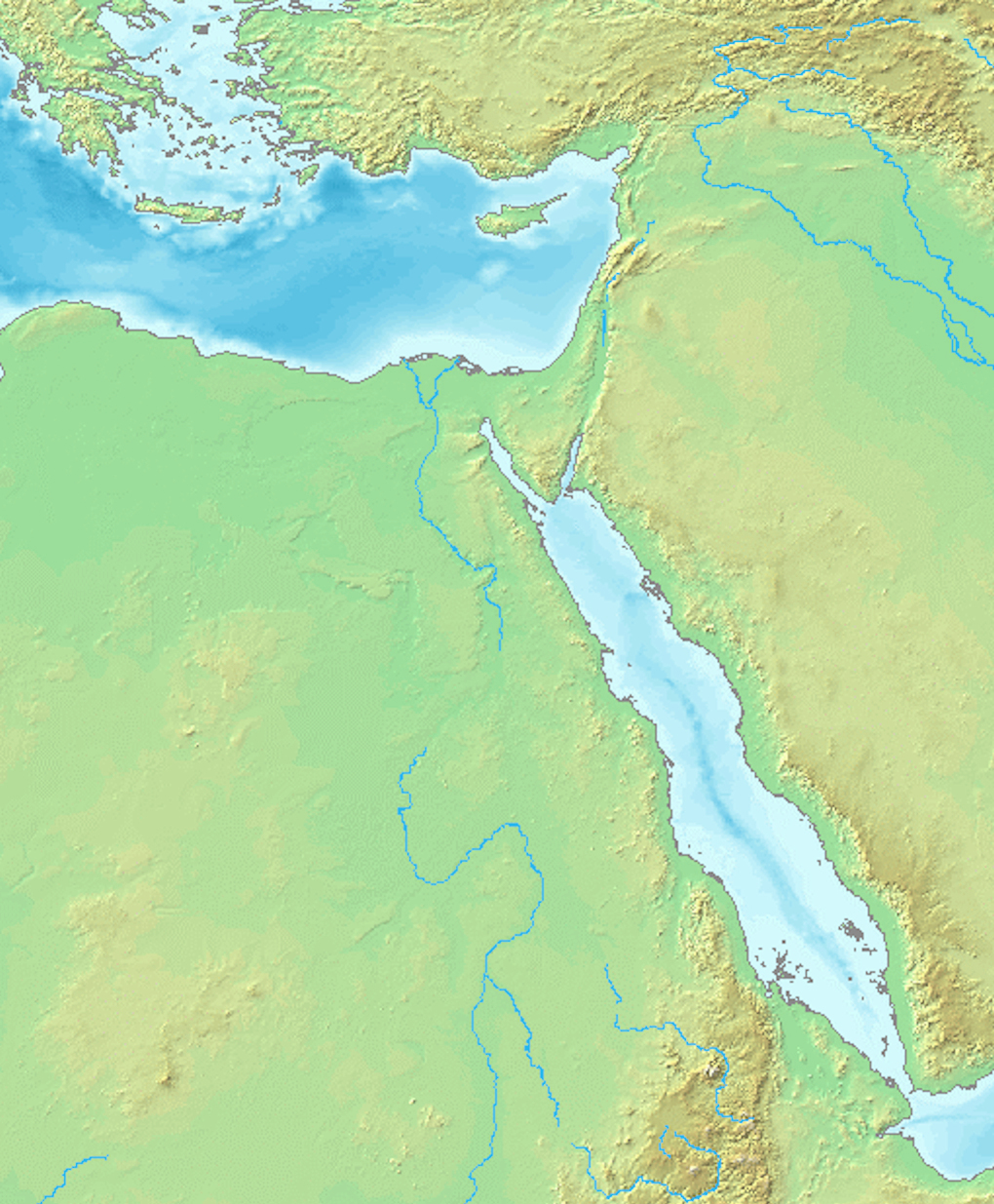
- Location within Northeast Africa Location within Sudan Location within Africa
- 18°32′12″N 31°49′42″E
- Type: Sanctuary
- Location: Karima, Northern State, Sudan
- Region: Nubia

UNESCO World Heritage Site
- Official name: Gebel Barkal and the Sites of the Napatan Region
- Type: Cultural
- Criteria: i, ii, iii, iv, vi
- Designated: 2003 (27th session)
- Reference no.: 1073
- Region: Arab States

Jebel Barkal or Gebel Barkal (Arabic: جبل بركل, romanized: Jabal Barkal) is a mesa located 400 km north of Khartoum, next to Karima in Northern State in Sudan, and near the Nile River in Nubia. The Jebel is 104 meters tall, has a flat top, and came to have religious significance for both ancient Kush and ancient Egyptian occupiers. In 2003, the mountain, together with the extensive archaeological site at its base, were named as a World Heritage Site by UNESCO. The area houses the Jebel Barkal Museum.

== History ==
The earliest occupation of Jebel Barkal was of the Kerma culture. (This occupation is so far known only from scattered potsherds.) The Kermans seemingly venerated the mesa in an Animistic fashion, passing the tradition on to the new kingdom Egyptians, and later Napatans and Meroites.

Around 1450 BCE, the Egyptian pharaoh Thutmose III conquered Jebel Barkal and built a fortified settlement (Egyptian menenu) there as the southern limit of the Egyptian empire. The city and region around it came to be called Napata, and the Egyptian occupation of Jebel Barkal extended through most of the New Kingdom of Egypt. The Egyptians built a complex of temples at the site, centered on a temple to Amun of Napata—a local, ram-headed form of the main god of the Egyptian capital city of Thebes, Egypt. In the last years of the New Kingdom and after its collapse in 1169 BC, there was little construction at Jebel Barkal. Apart from the temples, no trace of this Egyptian settlement has yet been found at the site.

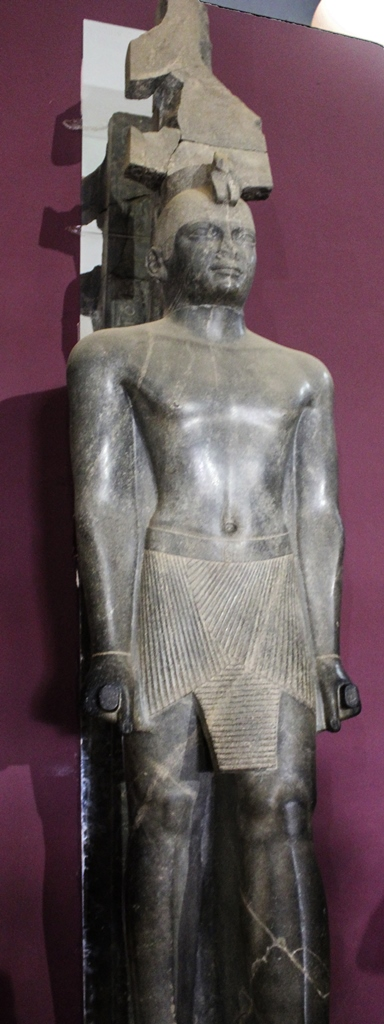
Statue of Pharaoh Taharqa from Jebel Barkal (3.6 meters). National Museum of Sudan.

Jebel Barkal was the capital city of the Kingdom of Kush as it returned to power in the years after 800 BCE as the Dynasty of Napata. The Kushite kings who conquered and ruled over Egypt as the 25th Dynasty, including Kashta, Piankhy (or Piye), and Taharqa, all built, renovated, and expanded monumental structures at the site.

After the Kushites were driven out by the Assyrian conquest of Egypt in the mid-7th century BC, they continued to rule Kush with Jebel Barkal and the city of Meroë as the most important urban centers of Kush. Jebel Barkal's palaces and temples continued to be renovated from the 7th-early 3rd centuries BC. Most of the royal pyramid burials of the kings and queens of Kush during this time were built at the site of Nuri, 9 km to the northeast of Jebel Barkal.

In 270 BCE, the location of Kushite royal burials was moved to Meroë, inaugurating the Meroitic period of the Kingdom of Kush. Jebel Barkal continued to be an important city of Kush during the Meroitic period. A sequence of palaces were built, most notably by King Natakamani, new temples were built and older temples were renovated. During the 1st century BC - 1st century AD, eight royal pyramid burials were built at Jebel Barkal (rather than at Meroë), for reasons that are not clear, but perhaps reflecting the prominence of one or more families from the city.

After the collapse of Kush during the 4th century AD, Jebel Barkal continued to be occupied in the medieval (Christian) period of Nubia, as attested by architectural remains, burials, and burial inscriptions.

== Temples ==
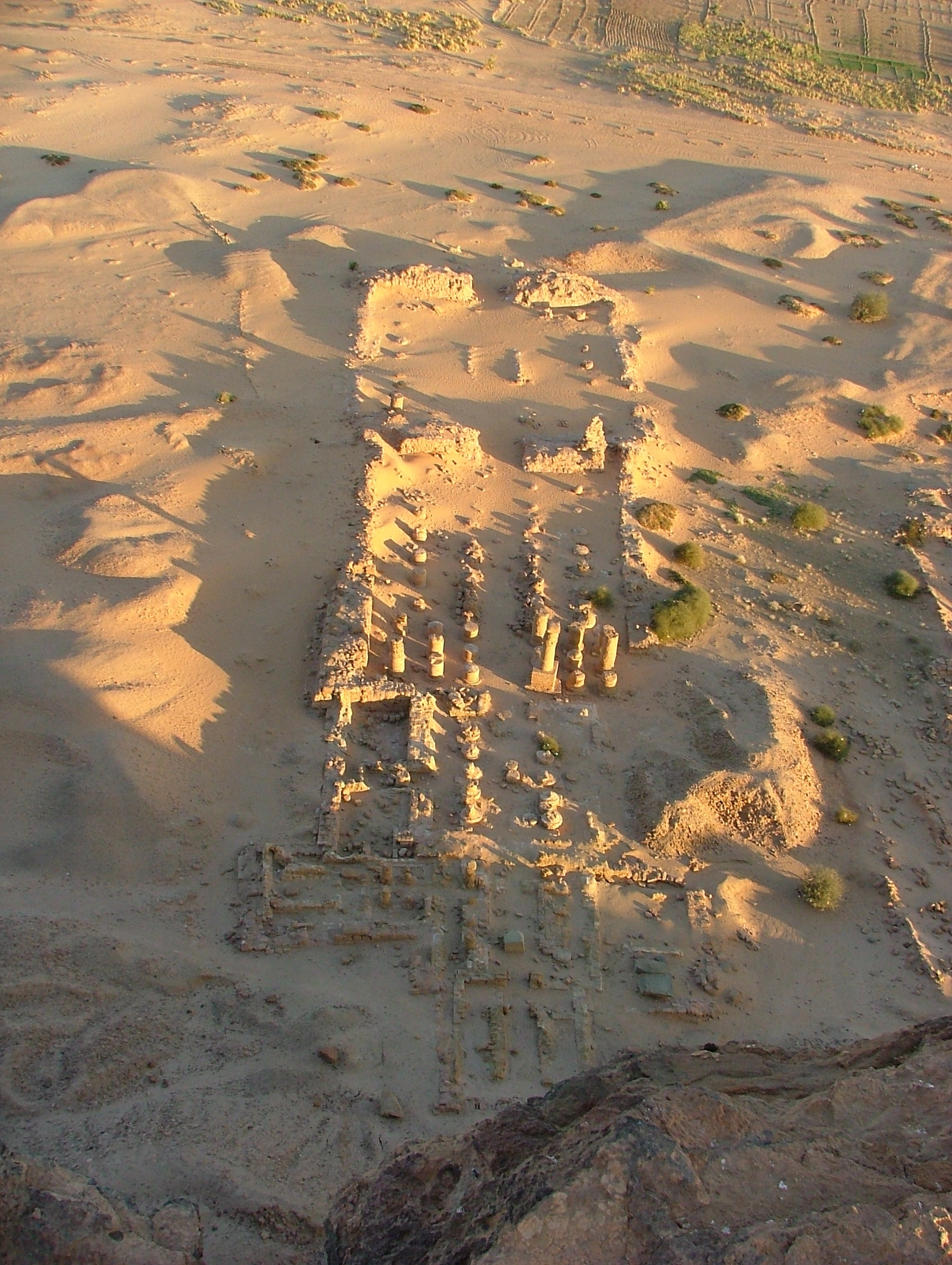
Ruins of the Temple of Amun at Jebel Barkal.

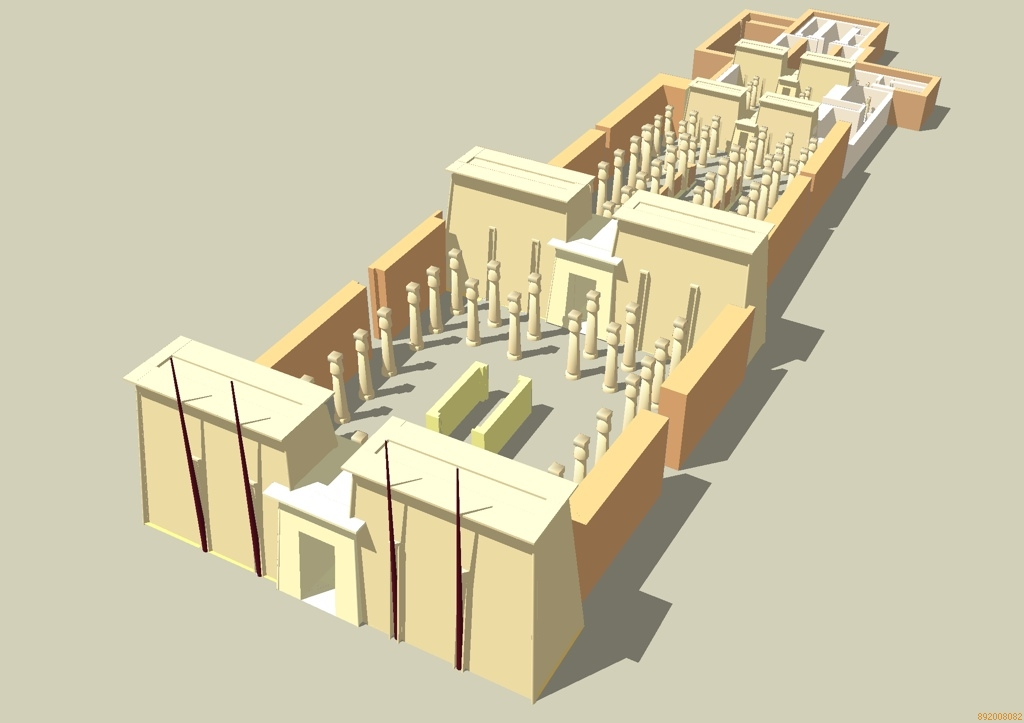
Temple of Amun at Jebel Barkal, originally built during the Egyptian New Kingdom but greatly enhanced by Piye.

The ruins around Jebel Barkal include at least 13 temples that were built, renovated, and expanded over a period of over 1,500 years. The temples were described for the first time by a series of European explorers beginning in the 1820s. Their drawings and descriptions, particularly those of Frédéric Cailliaud (1821), Louis Maurice Adolphe Linant de Bellefonds (1821), and Karl Richard Lepsius (1844), record significant architectural details that have since disappeared. In 1862 five inscriptions from the Third Intermediate Period were recovered by an Egyptian officer and transported to the Cairo Museum, but not until 1916 were scientific archeological excavations performed by a joint expedition of Harvard University and the Museum of Fine Arts of Boston under the direction of George Reisner. From the 1970s, explorations continued by a team from the University of Rome La Sapienza, under the direction of Sergio Donadoni, that was joined by another team from the Boston Museum, in the 1980s, under the direction of Timothy Kendall.

=== Temple of Amun and Temple of Mut ===
The larger temples, such as the Temple of Amun, are even today considered sacred to the local population. The carved wall painted chambers of the Temple of Mut are well preserved.

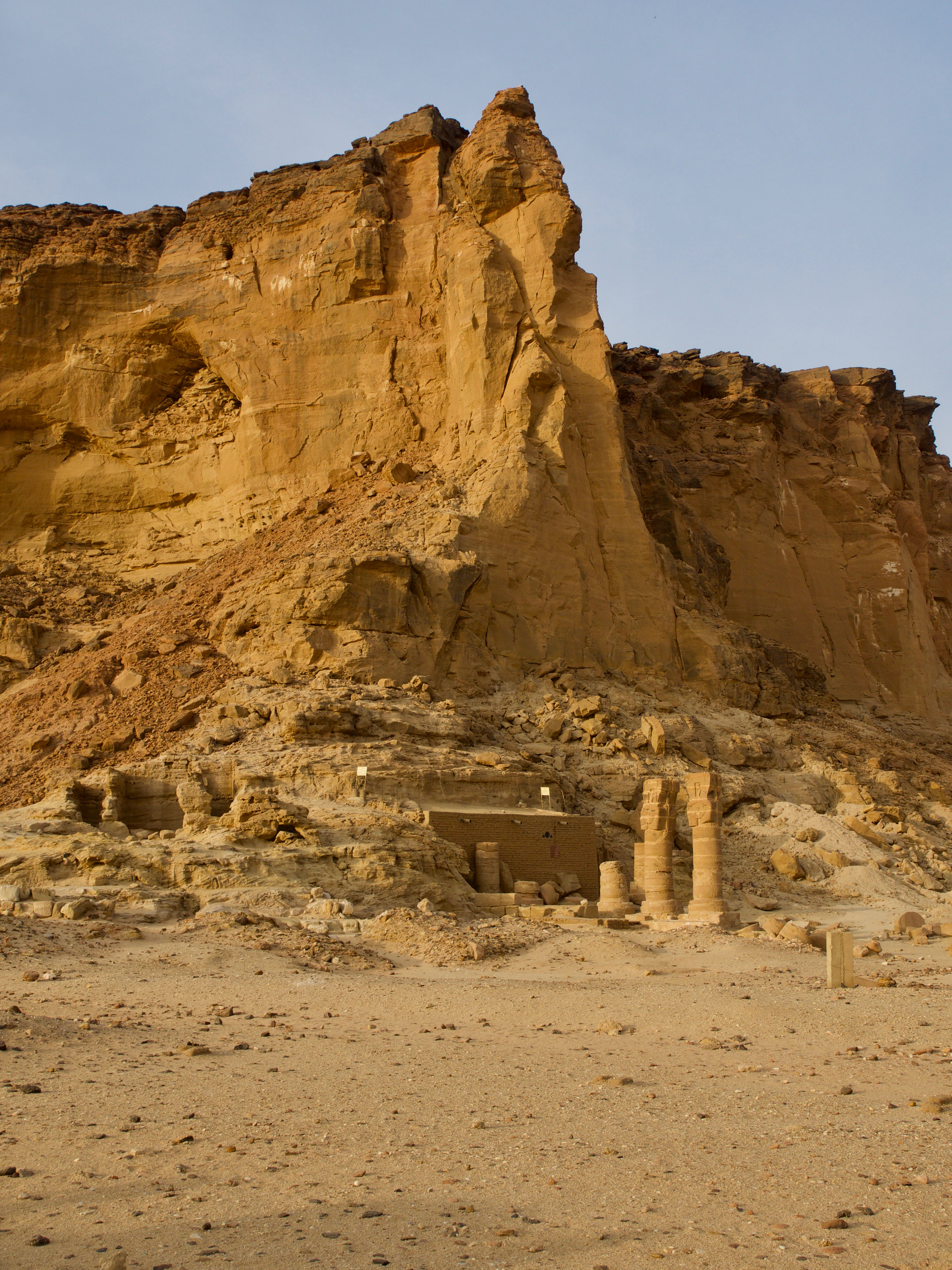
The last standing pillars of Napata's temple of Amun at the foot of Jebel Barkal

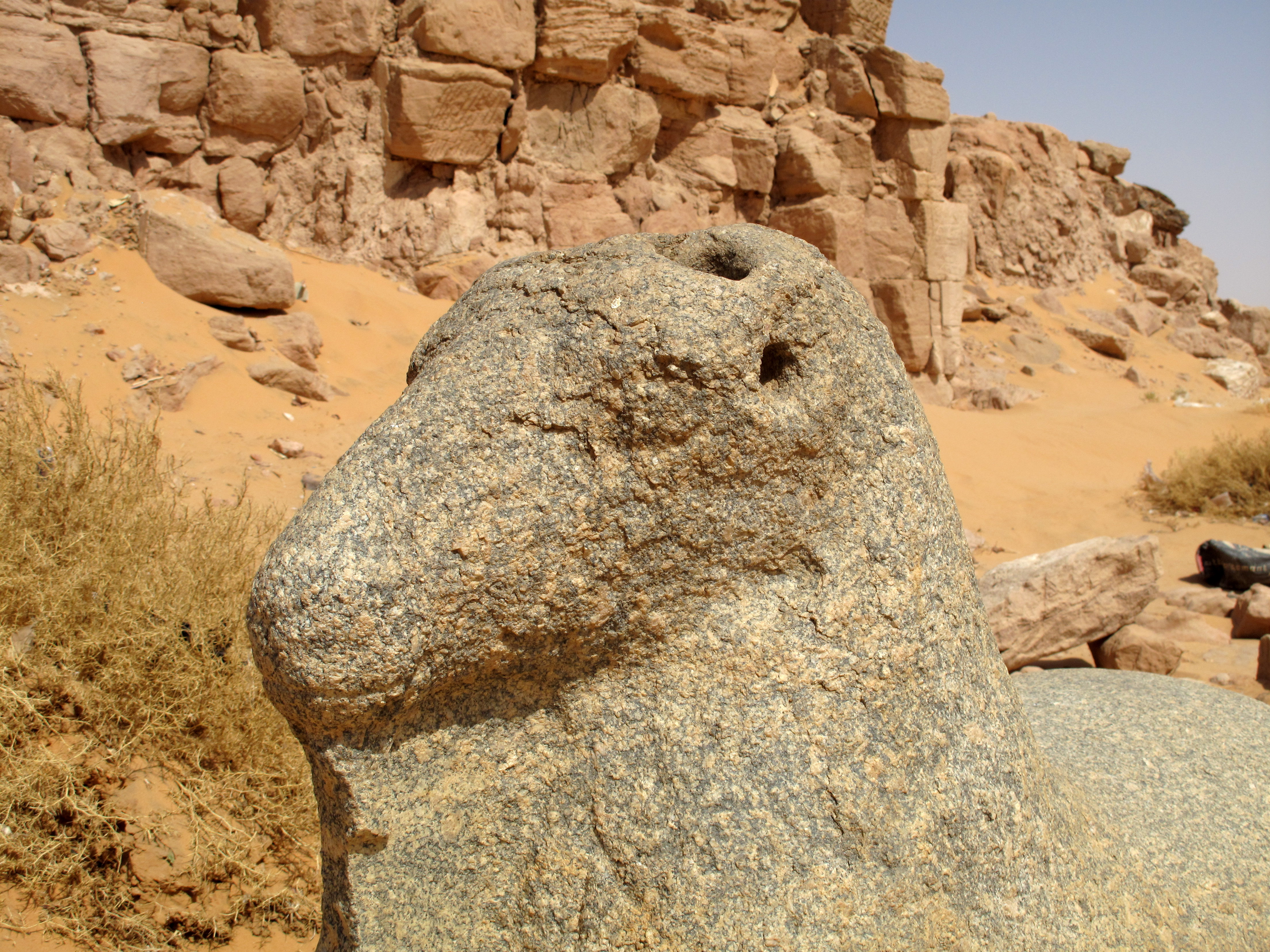
Stone statue of a ram

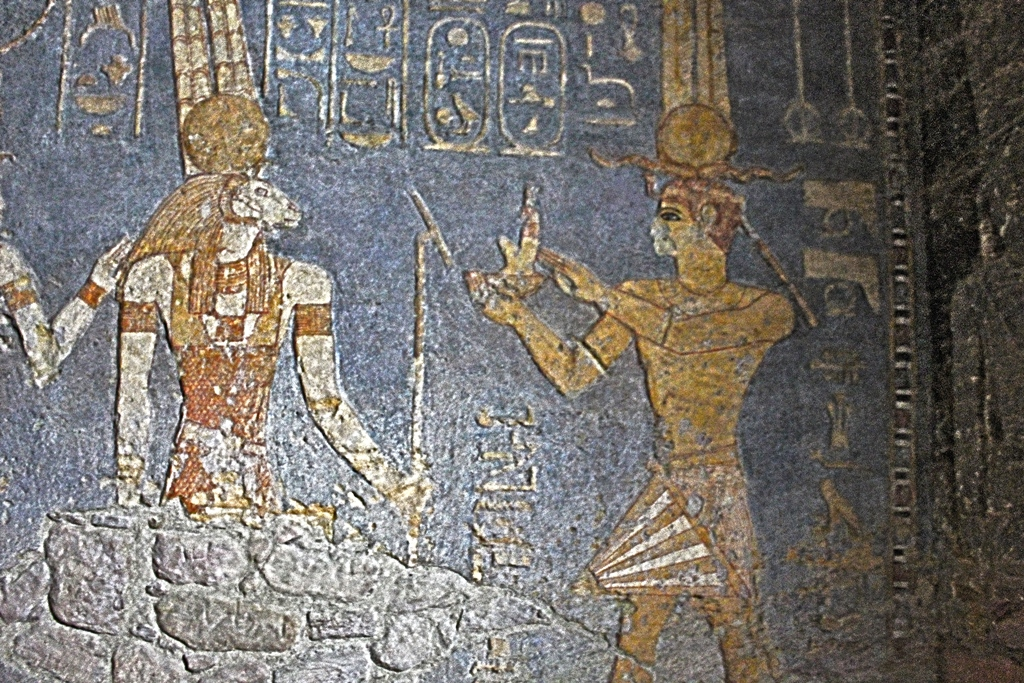
Lion-headed God Apademak with Pharaoh Taharqa (right) in the Jebel Barkal Temple of Mut.

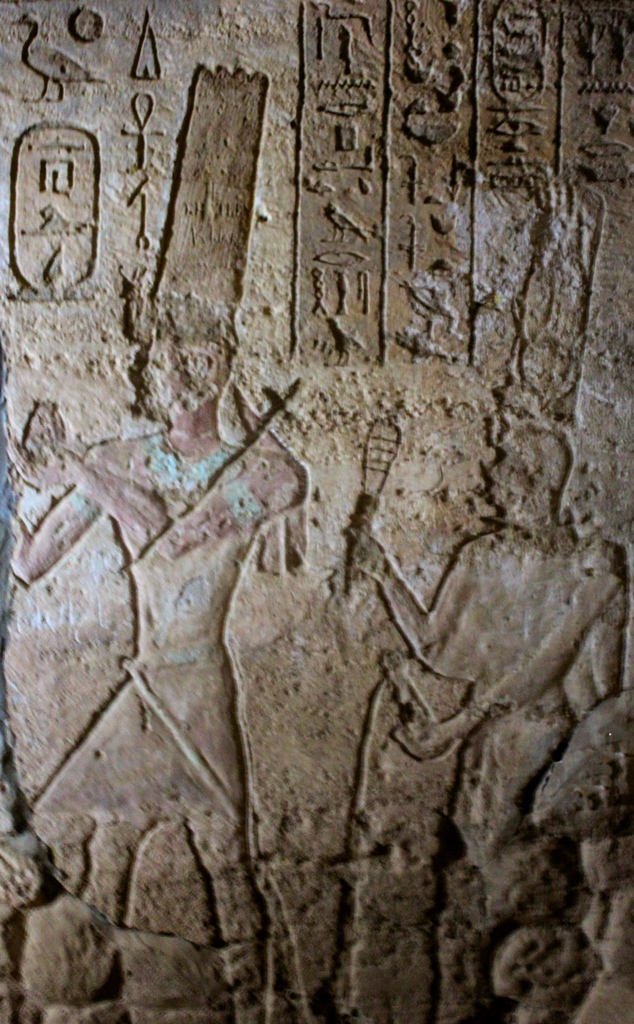
Taharqa, followed by the sistrum shaking queen Takahatenamun in the Jebel Barkal Temple of Mut.

=== Temple B700 ===
Temple B700, built by Atlanersa and decorated by Senkamanisken, is now largely destroyed. It received the sacred bark of Amun from the nearby B500 on certain cultic occasions, and may have served during the coronation of the kings of the early Napatan period, in the mid 7th century BC. The Temple was decorated by Senkamanisken, where he is shown clubbing enemies.

The hieroglyphic inscription on the Temple described the role of the god Amun in selecting Senkamanisken as king:

I said of you [while you were still] in your mother's womb that you were to be ruler of Kemet ["Black Land", probably meaning Egypt and Kush]. I knew you in the semen, while you were in the egg, that you were to be lord. I made you receive the Great Crown, which Re caused to appear on the first good occasion. [Inasmuch as] a father makes his son excellent, it is I who decreed kingship to you. [So] who shall share it with you? For I am the Lord of Heaven. As I give to Re, [so] he gives to his children, from gods to men. It is I who gives you the royal charter.... No other [can] decree (who is to be) king. It is I who grants kingship to whomever I will.

— Amun inscription, frieze of Senkamanisken, Temple B700, Jebel Barkal.

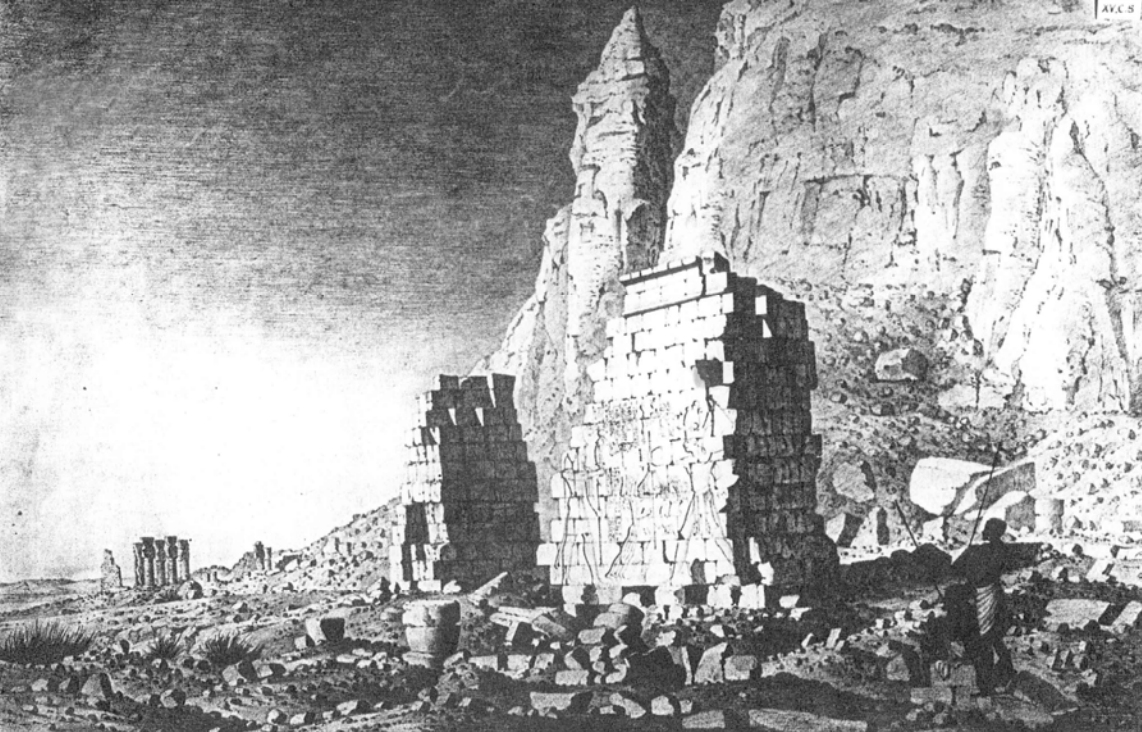
Ruins of Temple B700 of Jebel Barkal with relief of Senkamanisken clubbing enemies, drawn in 1821 by Louis Maurice Adolphe Linant de Bellefonds

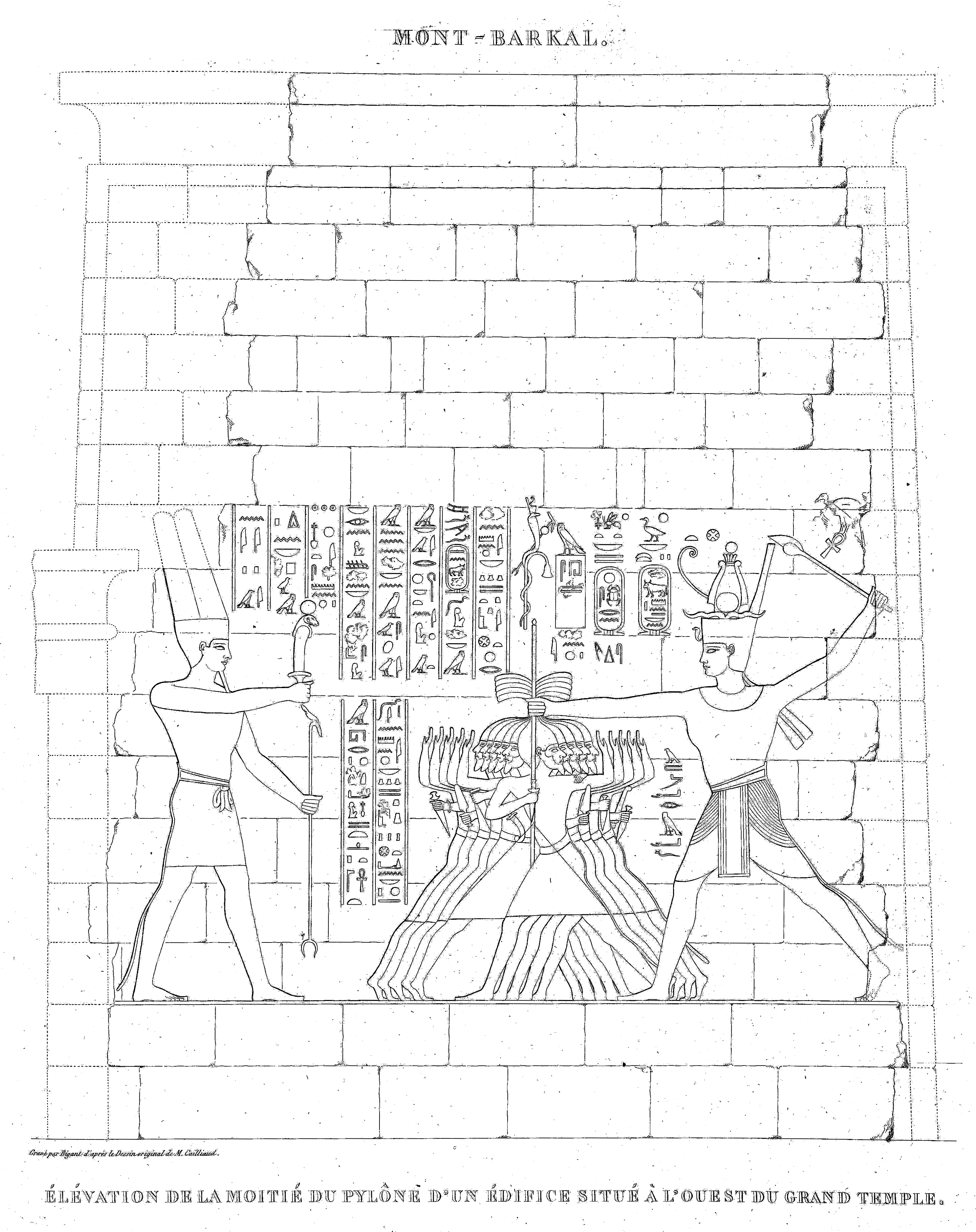
Senkamanisken slaying enemies in front of God Amun, at Jebel Barkal (pylon of building B 700, west of the main temple).

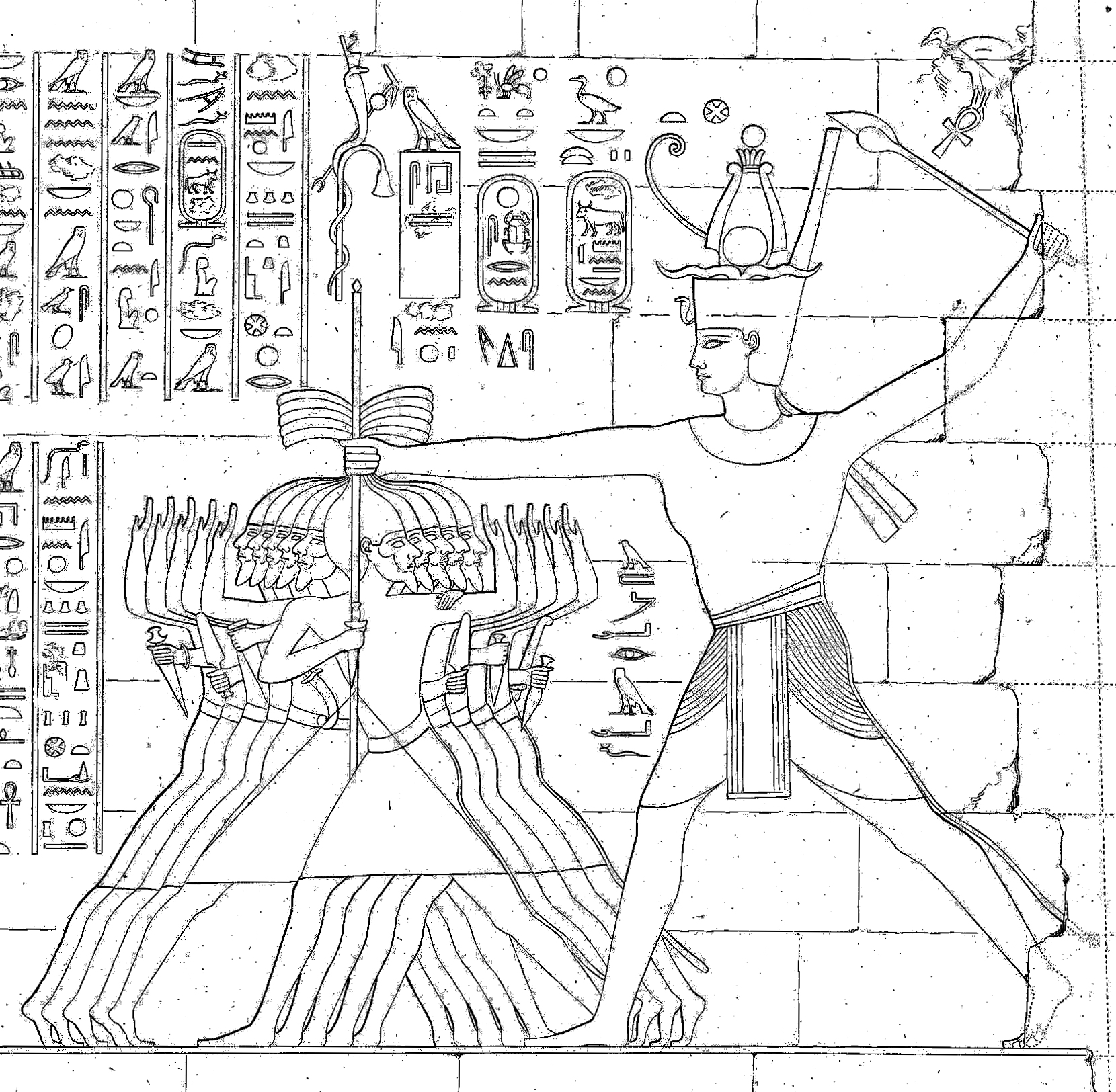
Senkamanisken slaying enemies at Jebel Barkal (detail).

== Pyramids ==
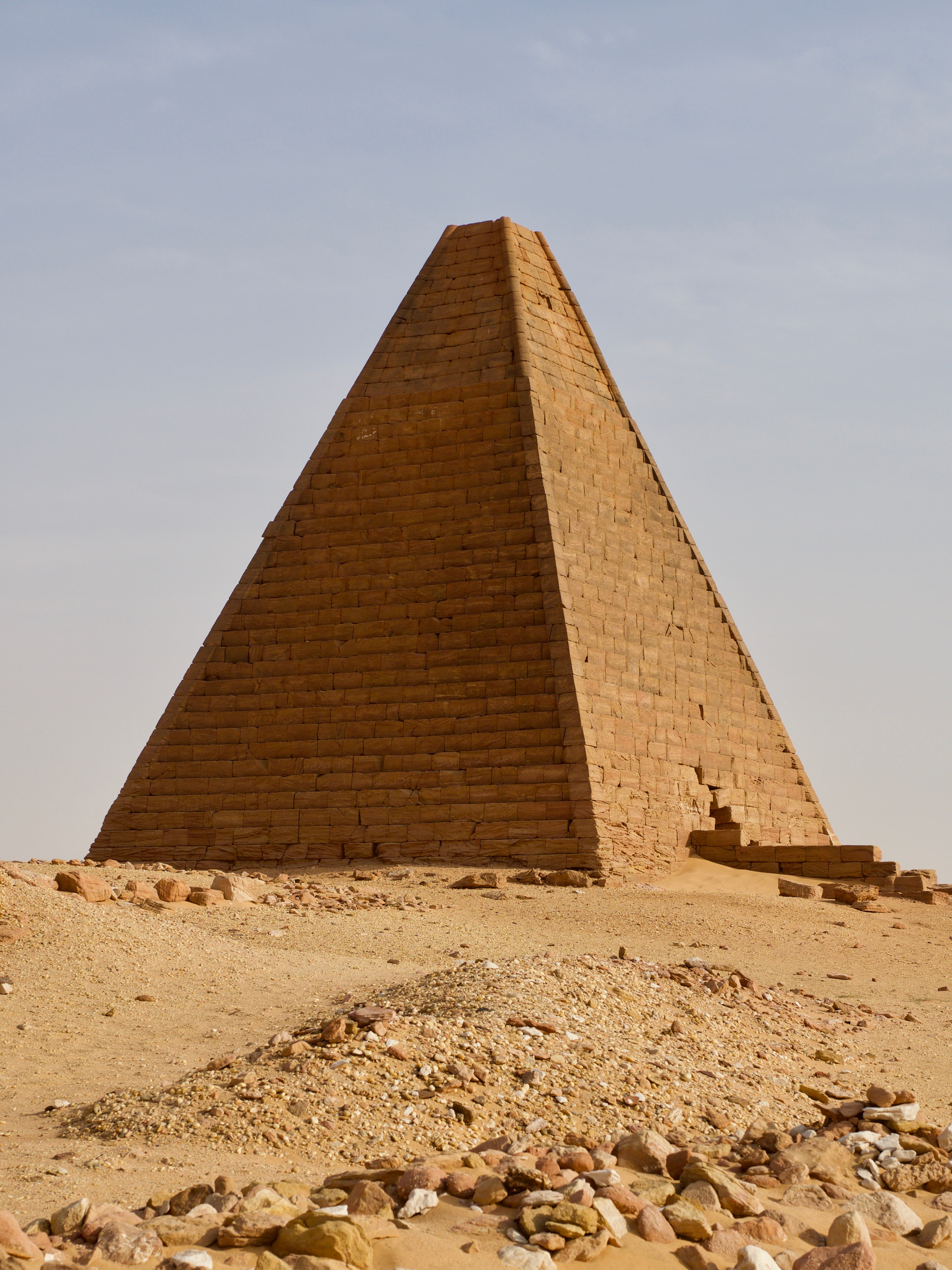
Pyramid at Jebel Barkal.

Jebel Barkal served as a royal cemetery during the Meroitic Kingdom. The earliest burials date back to the 3rd century BC.

- Bar. 1 King from the middle of the 1st century BCE
- Bar. 2 King Teriqas (c. 29–25 BCE)
- Bar. 4 Queen Amanirenas ? (1st century BCE)
- Bar. 6 Queen Nawidemak (1st century BCE)
- Bar. 7 King Sabrakamani? (3rd century BCE)
- Bar. 9 King or Queen of the early 2nd century CE
- Bar. 11 King Aktisanes (3rd century BCE)
- Bar. 14 King Aryamani (3rd century BCE)
- Bar. 15 King Kash[...]merj Imen (3rd century BCE)
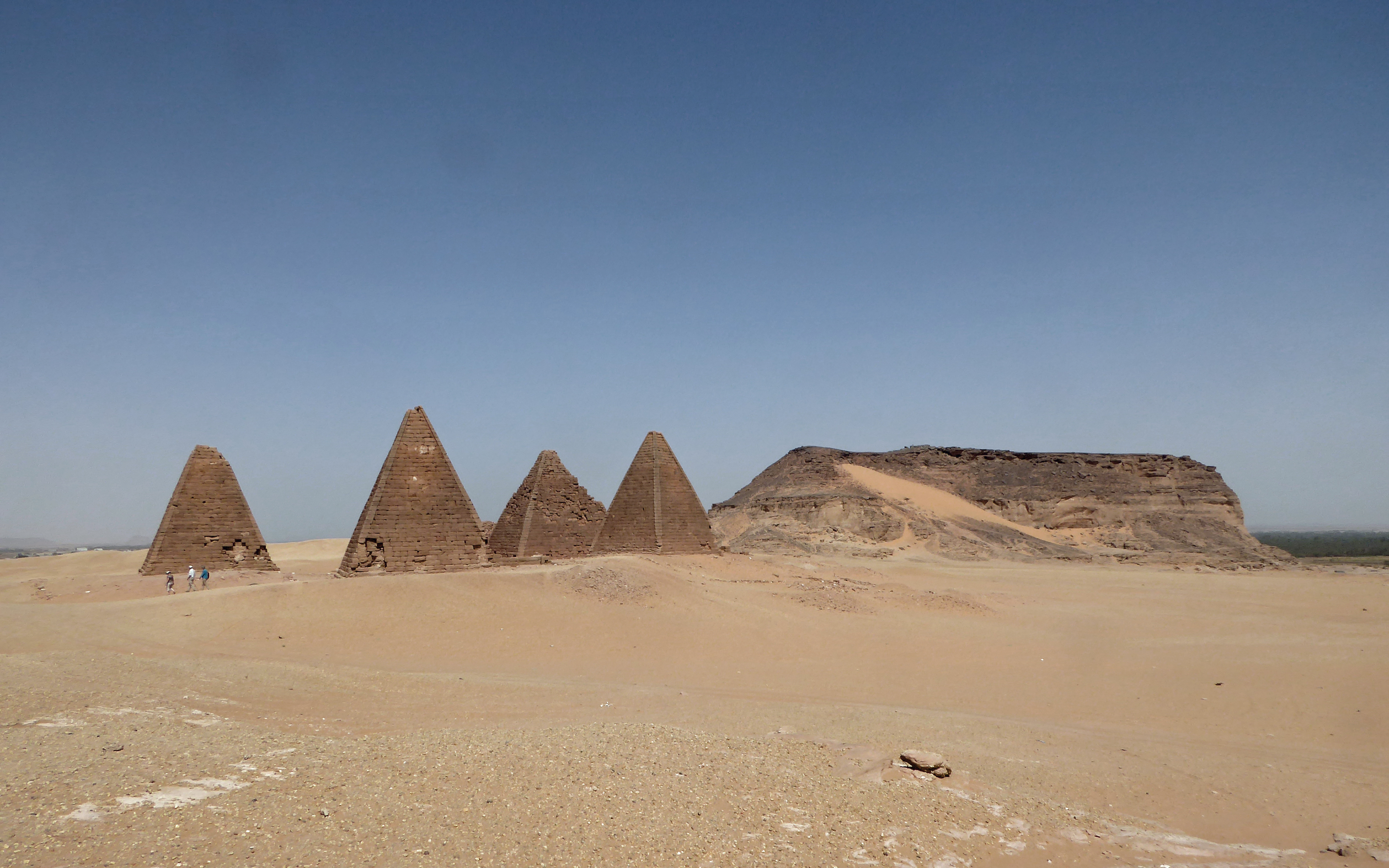
Pyramids, next to Jebel Barkal

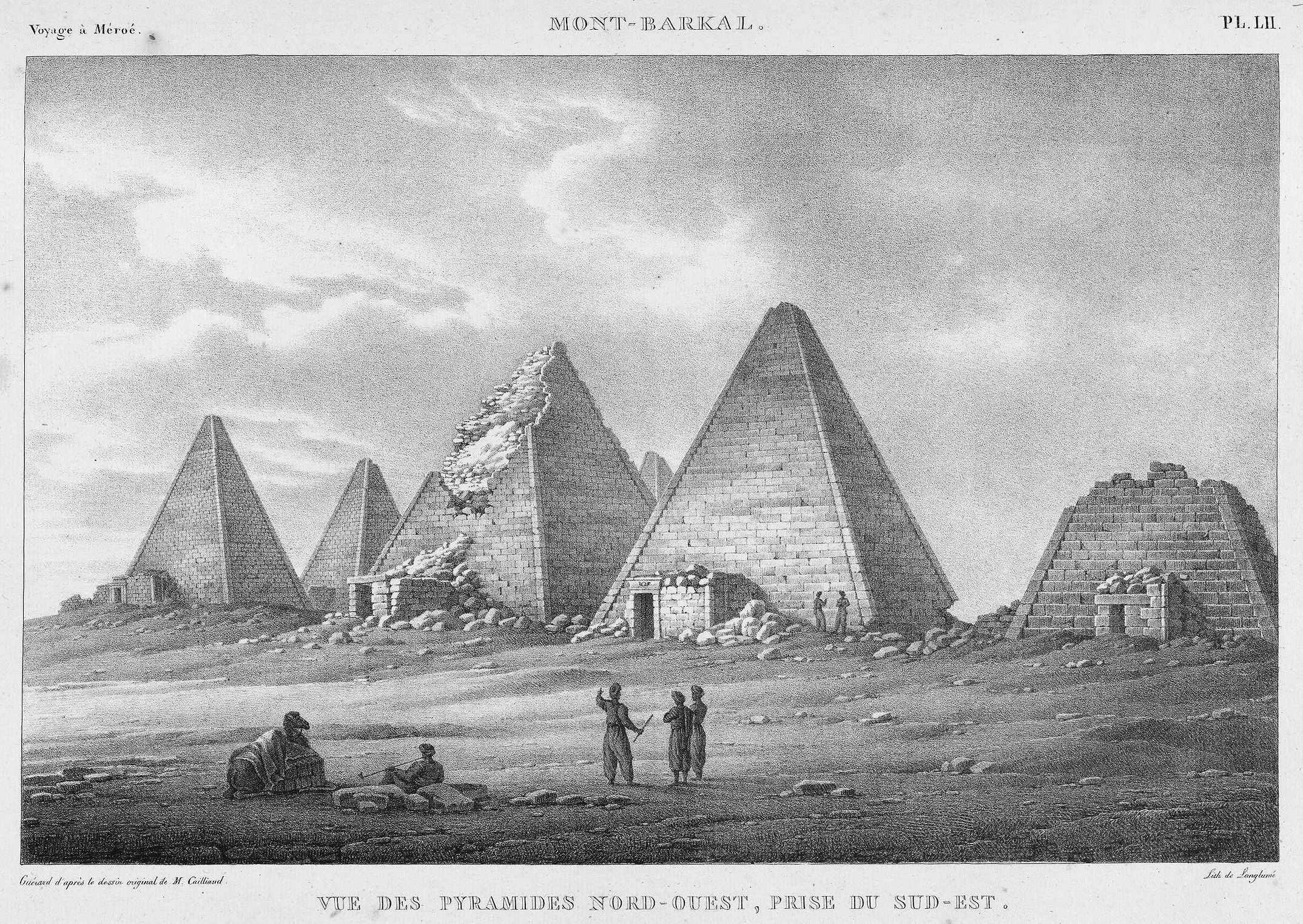
Pyramids at Jebel Barkal in 1821

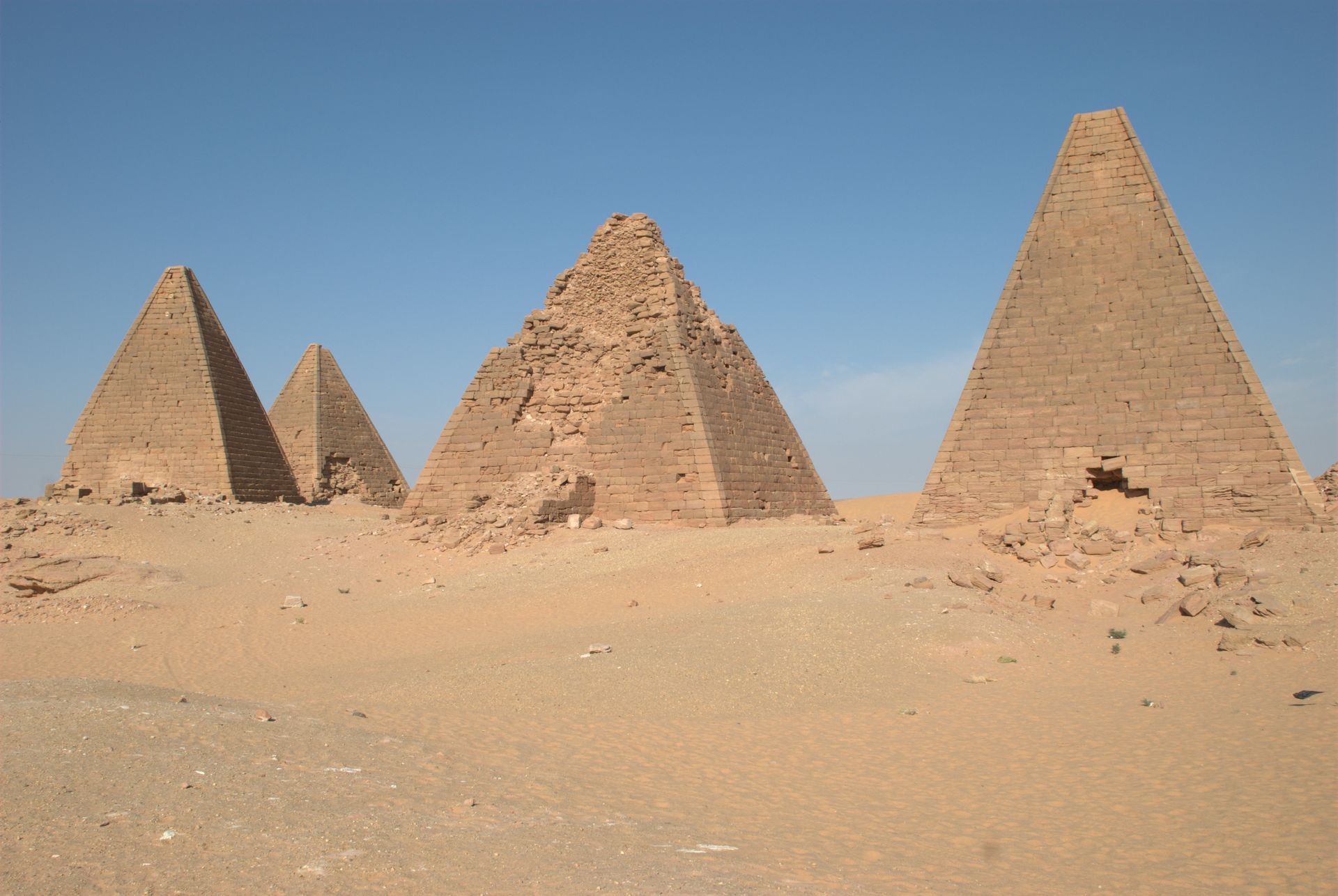
Pyramids of Jebel Barkal today

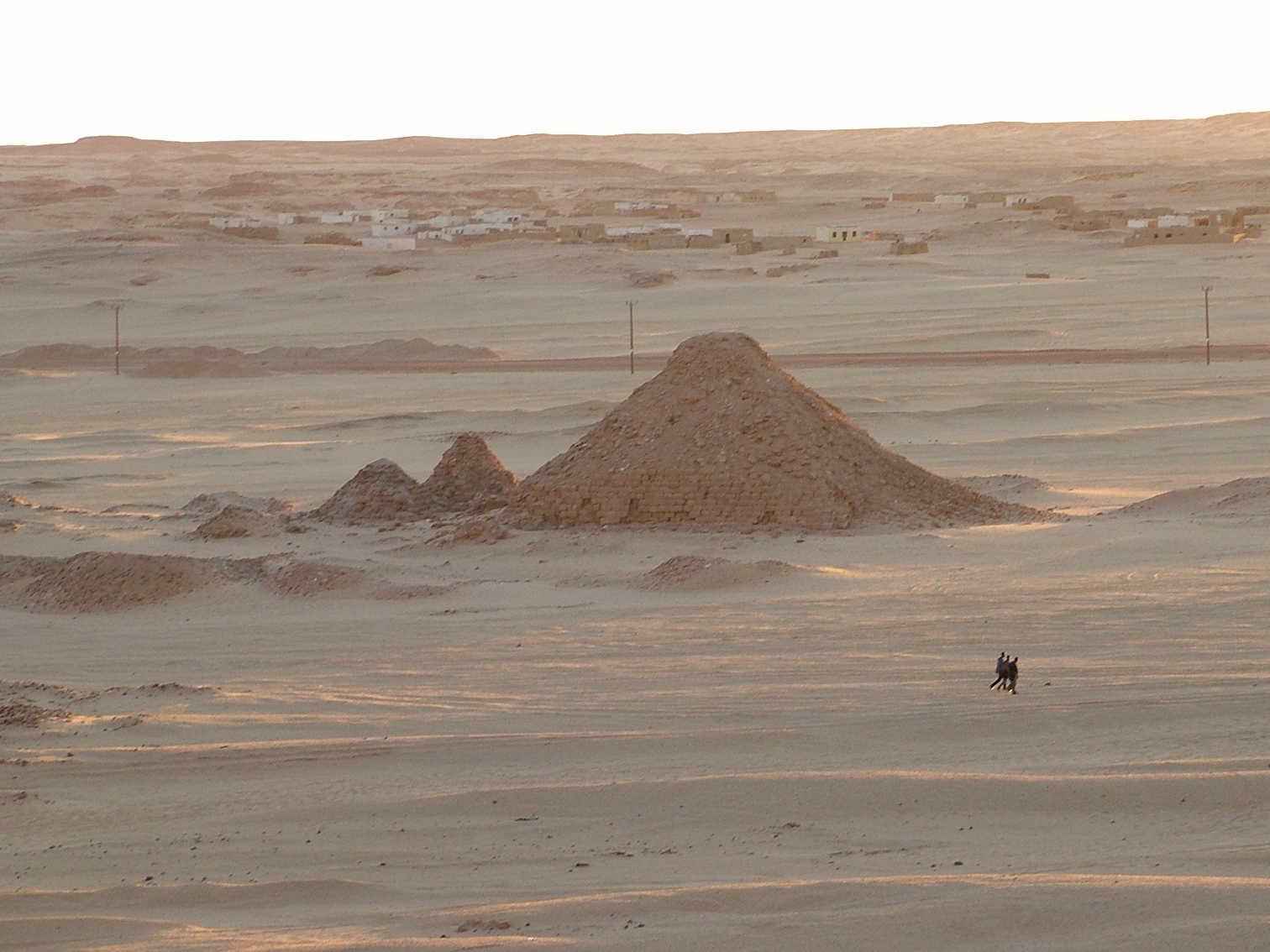
Pyramids in the southern group

== Excavation ==
Napata’s urban remains have not yet been significantly excavated, but rubble heaps indicate that the area was probably home to major settlement in antiquity. There are no traces of a pre-Egyptian settlement, though this may change as more is uncovered at the site. The earliest buildings found at Napata date from the middle of the eighteenth Dynasty. The first archaeologist to work at the site was George A. Reisner who worked there from 1916-1920 and excavated a number of buildings. His first excavation at Napata was a large Meroitic structure (Named “B 100”) that dated to the first century CE. At first, Reisner assumed this to be an “administrative building”, though it is now known to have been a palace.

== Artifacts in museums ==
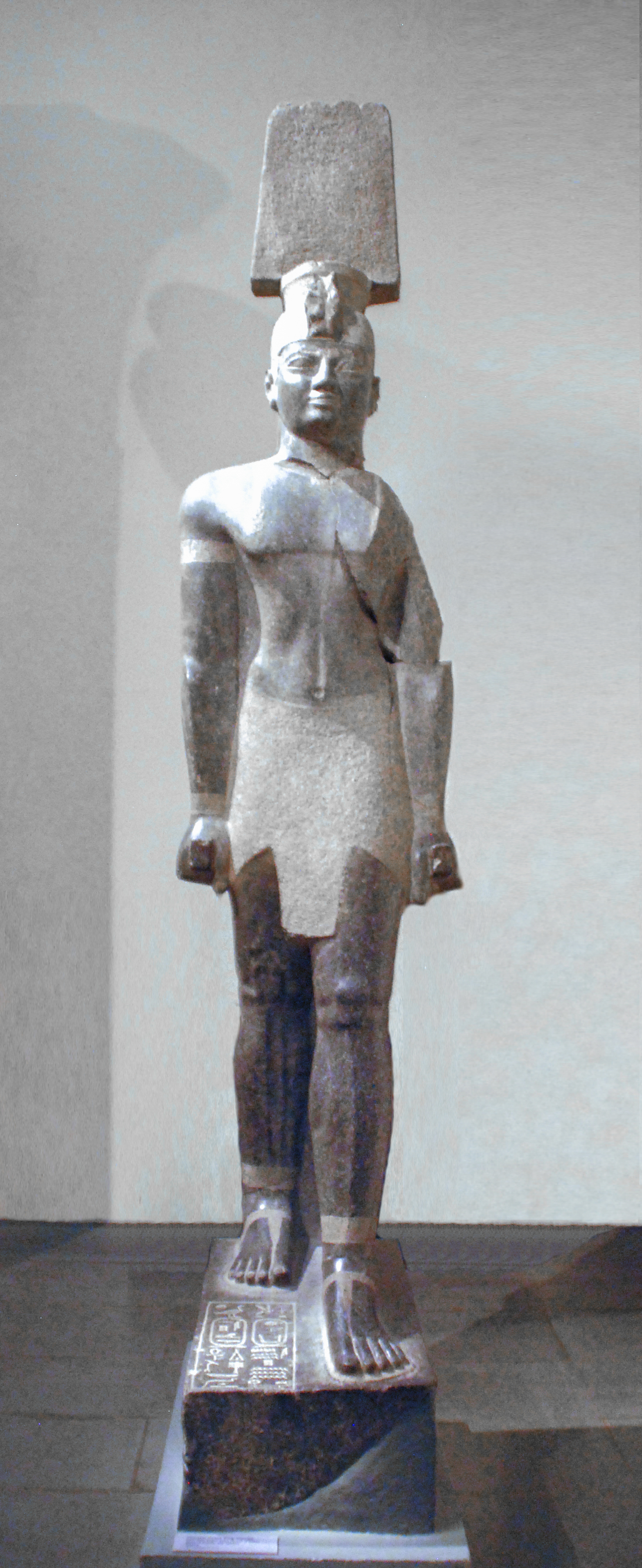
Colossal statue of King Aspelta from the Temple of Amun, Jebel Barkal in the Boston Museum of Fine Arts.

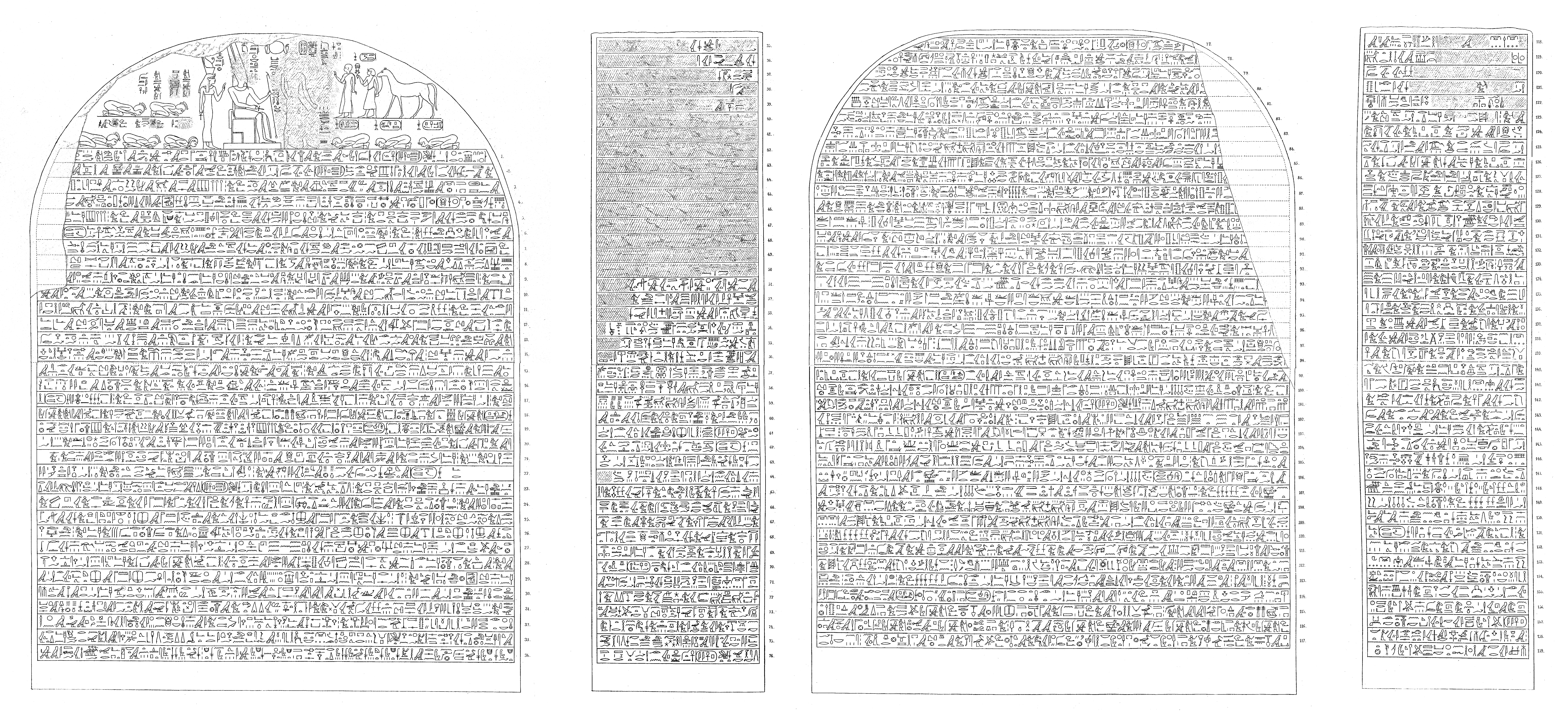
The Stele of Piye was discovered in Jebel Barkal. Cairo Museum

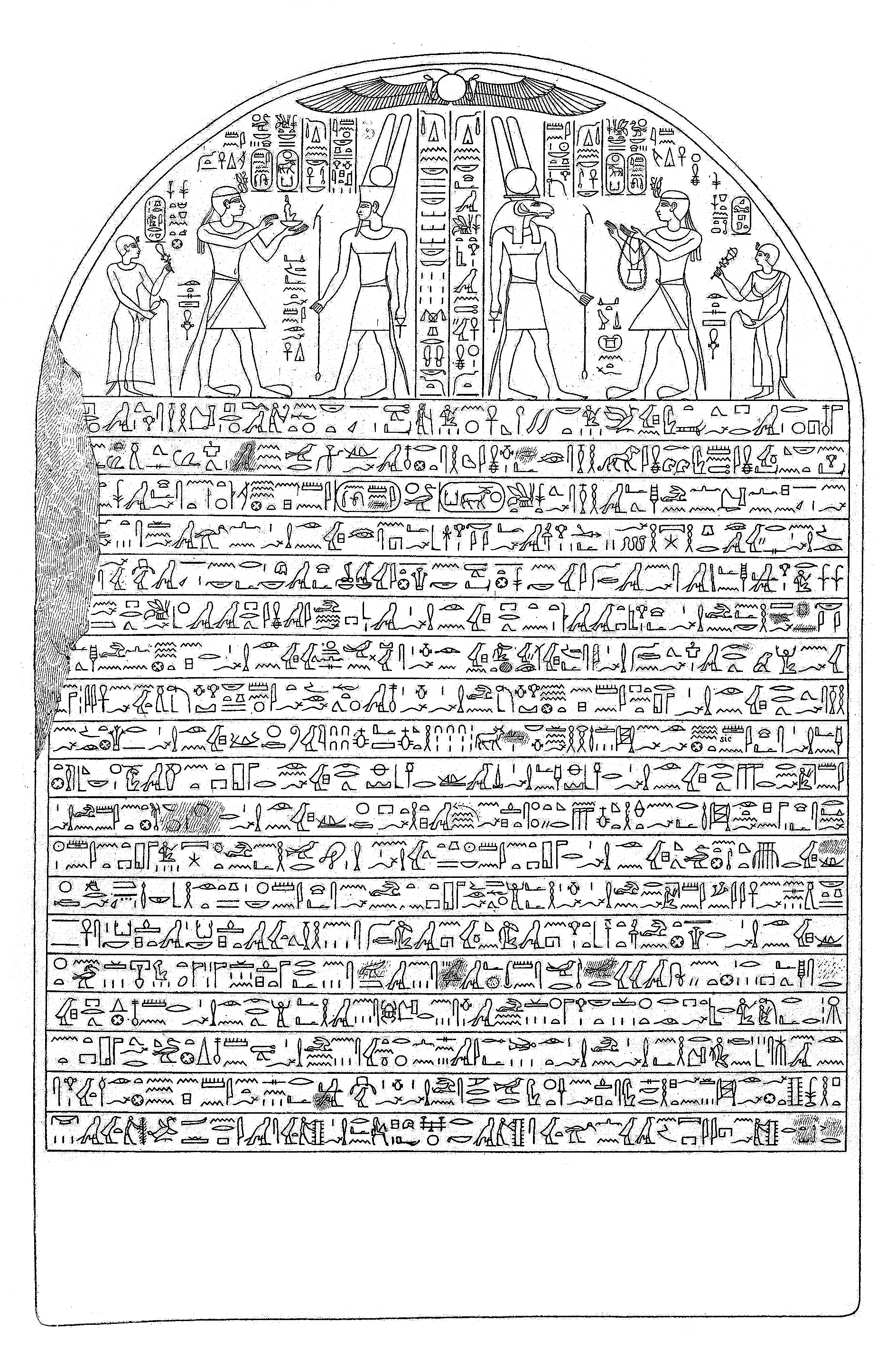
The Stele of Tantamani. Cairo Museum

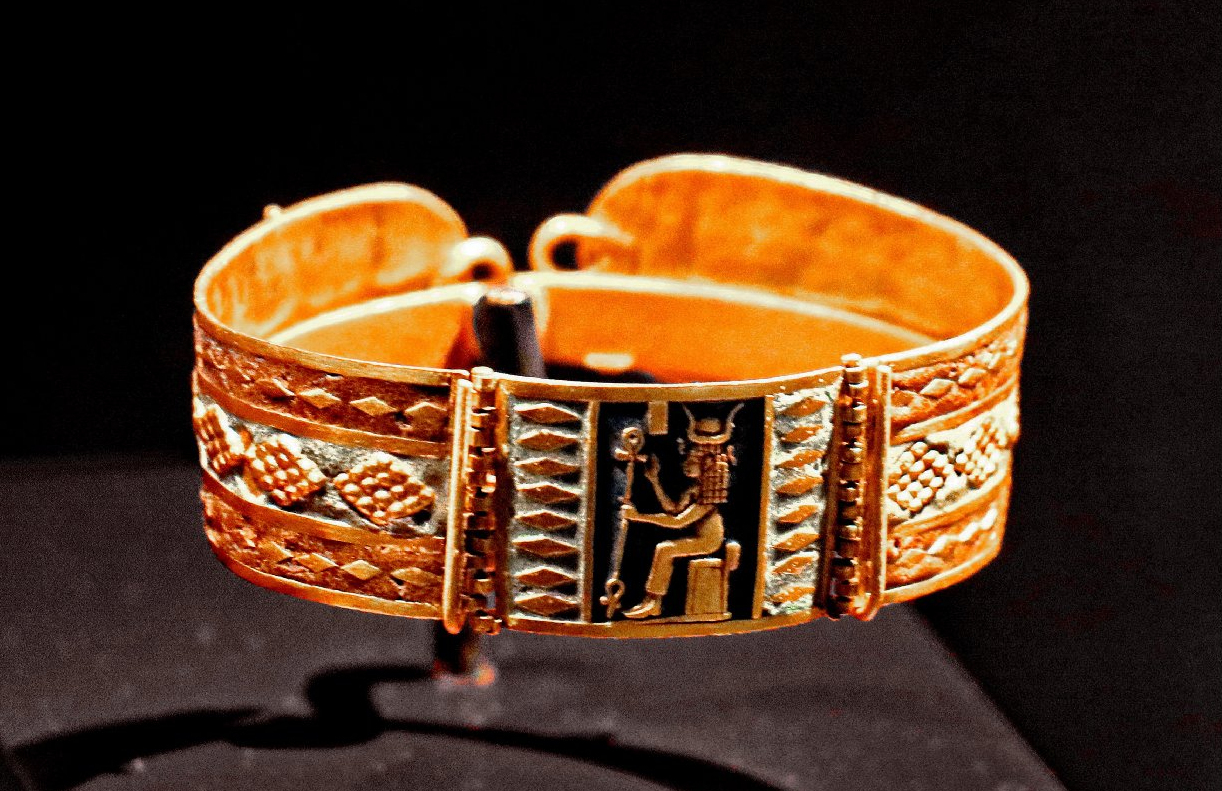
Golden Bracelet found in the tomb of a member of the Royal Family in Jebel Barkal. Meroitic period, 250-100 BCE

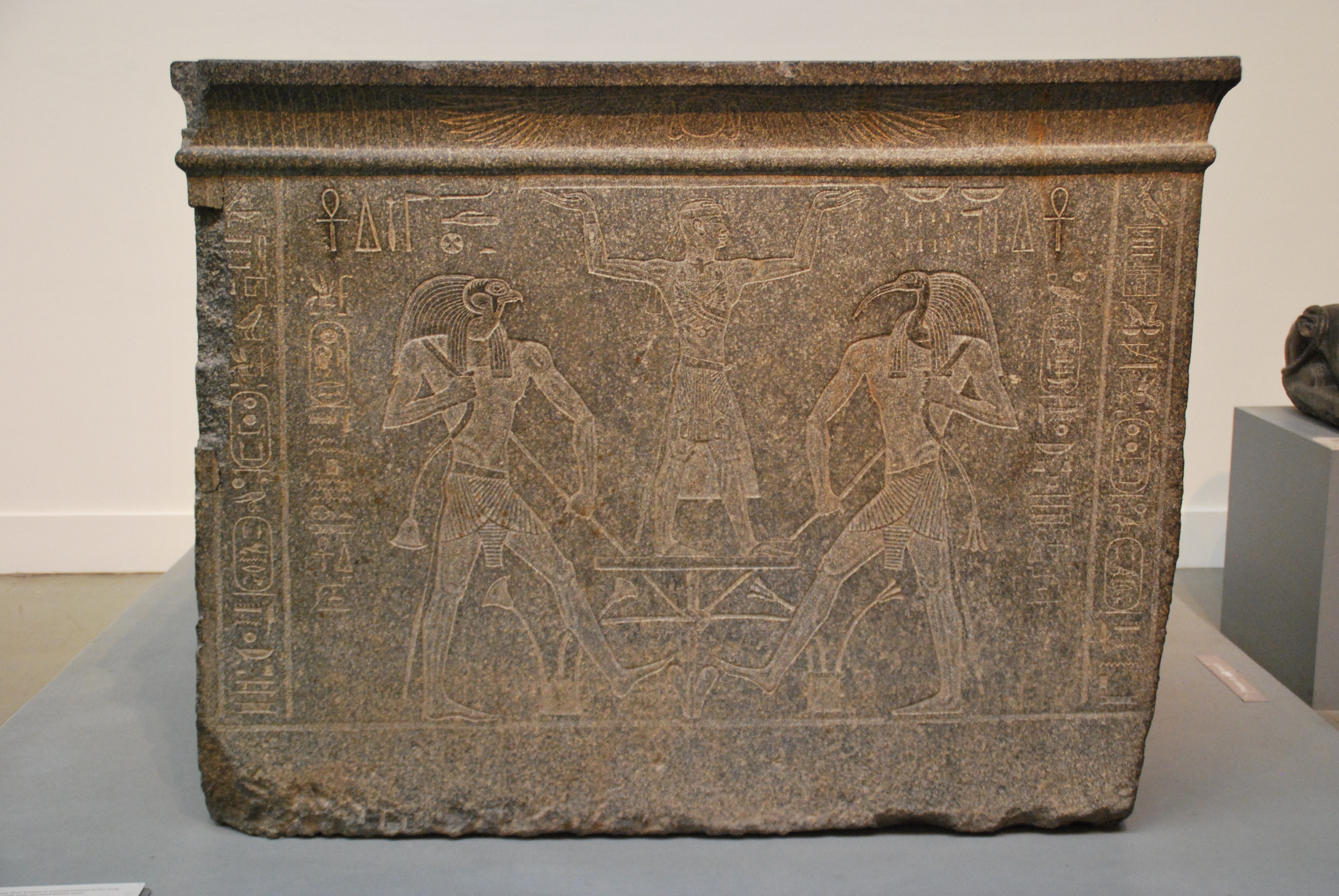
Barque stand from Temple B700 showing Atlanersa holding up the heavens, now in the Museum of Fine Arts in Boston

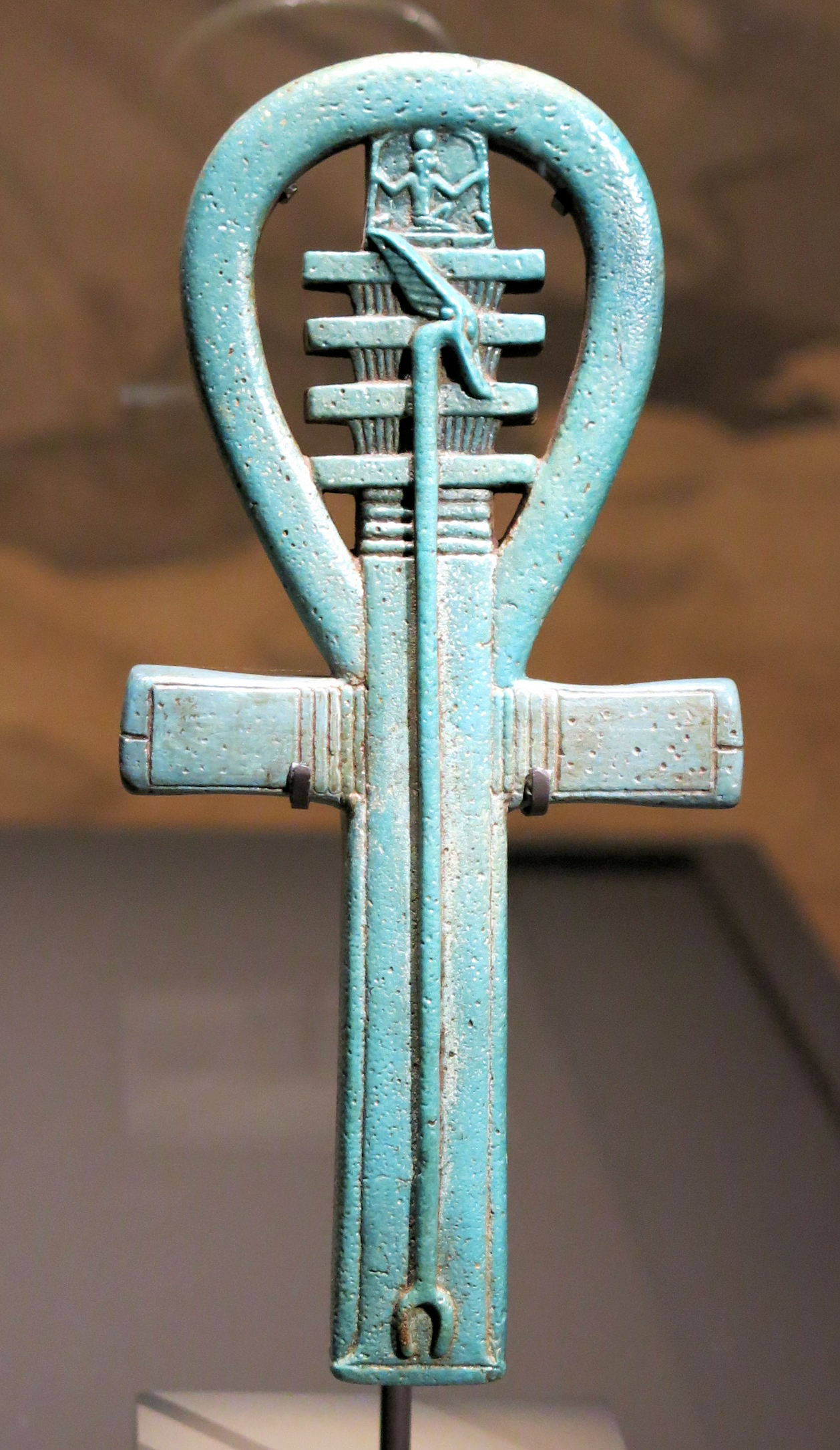
Djed amulet, Jebel Barkal, 25th Dynasty. Ânkh-Djed-Ouas (British Museum, EA 54412)

== See also ==
- List of World Heritage Sites in Africa
- Nubian pyramids
- Pyramids at El-Kurru
- Pyramids of Jebel Barkal
- Pyramids of Meroë
- Pyramids of Nuri
- Sedeinga pyramids

== Sources ==
- Reisner, George Andrew (1925). "Excavations in Egypt and Ethiopia 1922–1925" (PDF). Museum of Fine Arts Bulletin. XXIII (137). Boston, Massachusetts: Museum of Fine Arts: 17–29. Archived from the original (PDF) on 2019-08-19.
- "Boat stand of King Atlanersa". Museum of Fine Arts, Boston. "accession number 23.728b"
- "Fragments of the bark stand of King Atlanersa". Museum of Fine Arts, Boston. "accession number 23.728b"
