= Jebel Barkal Museum =

Museum in Karima, Sudan

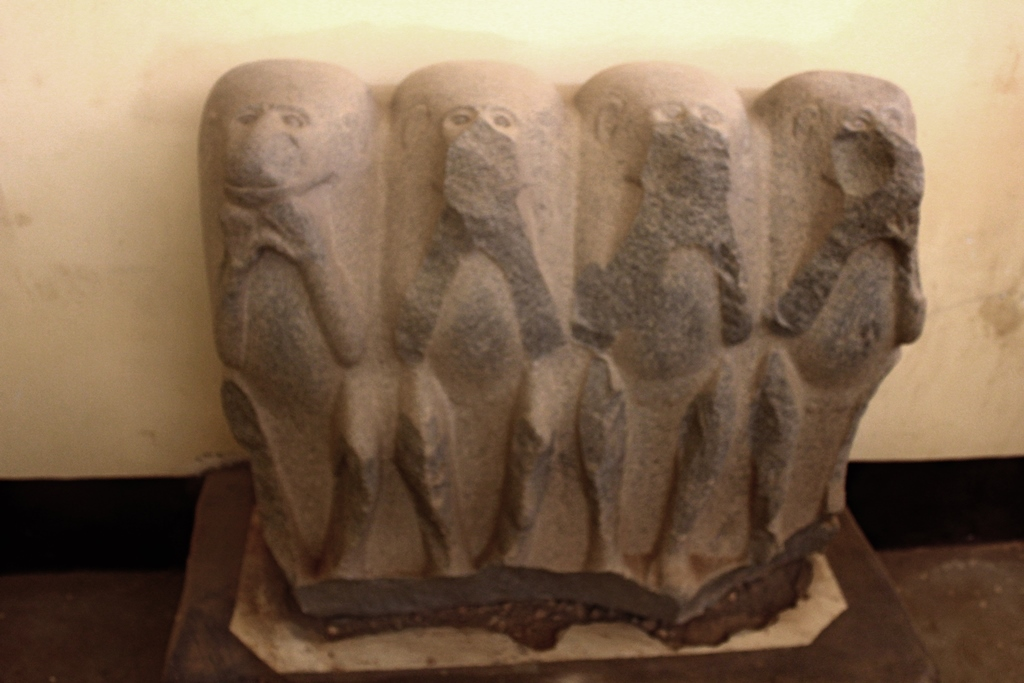
- Statue representing a row of four baboons. Napatan period from Taharqa temple at Sanam
- Established: 1979
- Location: Archaeological site of Jebel Barkal, Sudan
- Coordinates: 18°31′58.2″N 31°49′42.5″E
- Type: Archaeological collection
- Website: jebel-barkal-museum.museum.com

The Jebel Barkal Museum is an archaeological site museum located on the eastern side of the archaeological area of Jebel Barkal at Karima in the Northern State of Sudan.

== Displays ==
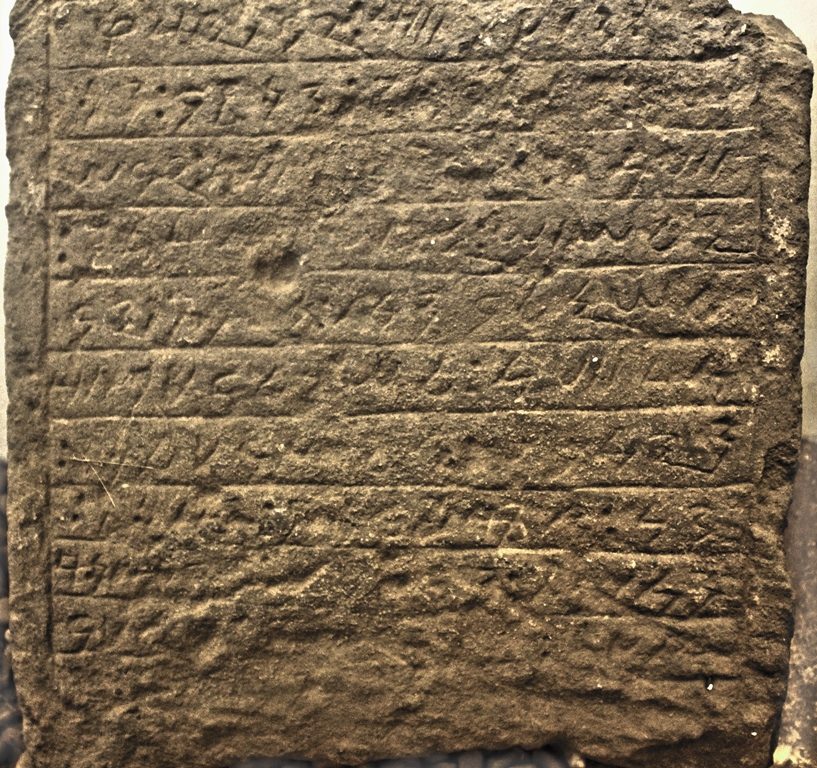
Stela with meroitic inscriptions for Natakamani and Amanitore

The three gallery rooms of the museum display artefacts and pottery findings from excavations conducted in the Jebel Barkal area, among them one of the royal Twenty-fifth Dynasty of Egypt statues found by George A. Reisner in 1916.
