= Karima, Sudan =

Karima كريمة
- Town
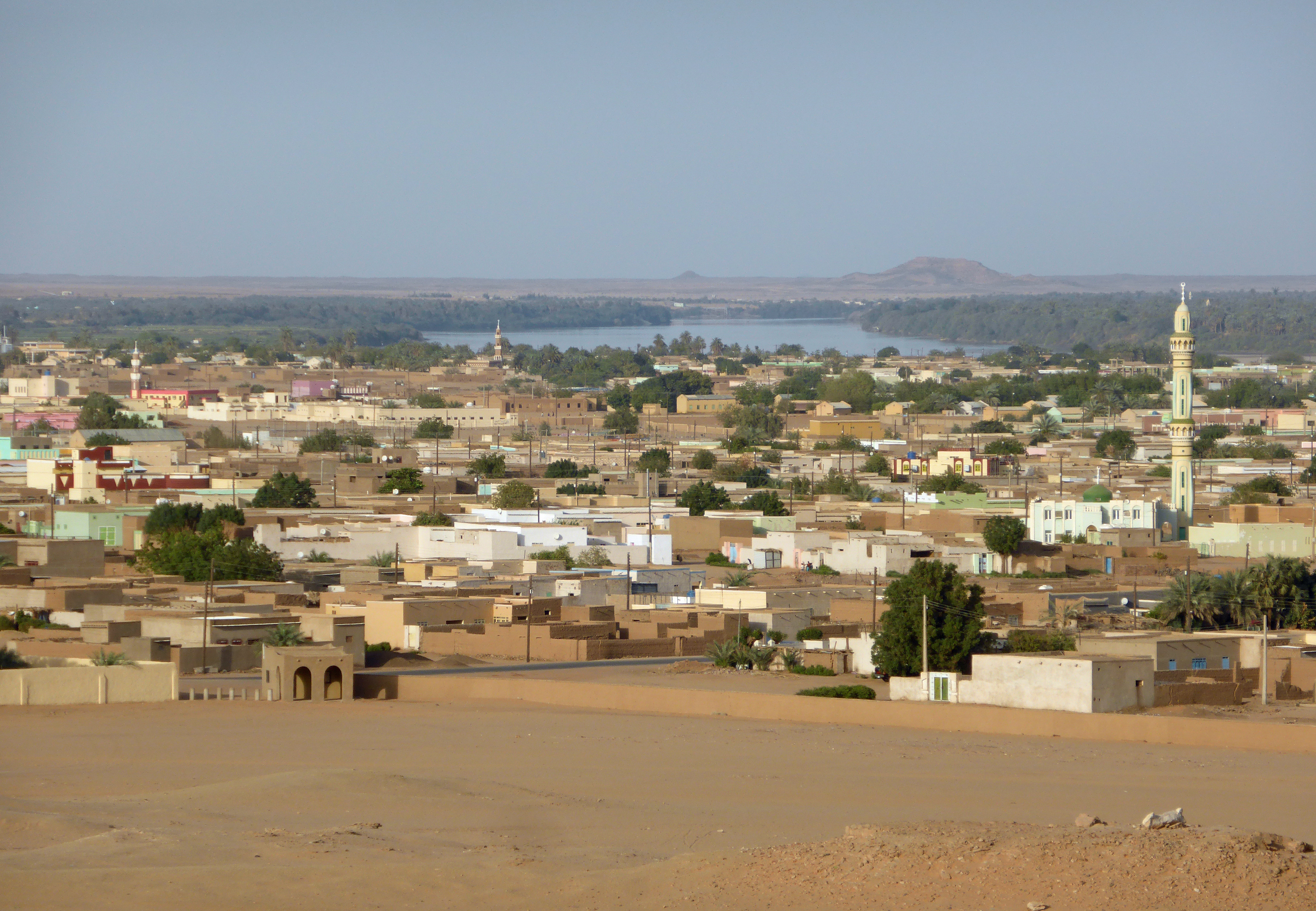

- Location in Sudan Karima (Africa)
- Coordinates: 18°33′N 31°51′E
- Country: Sudan
- Admin. division: Northern
- Elevation: 255 m (837 ft)

Population (2012)
  - Total: 13,981

Karima (Arabic: كريمة) is a town in Northern State in Sudan some 400 km from Khartoum on a loop of the Nile. Karima houses the Jebel Barkal Museum. The hill of Jebel Barkal is near Karima. Beside it are the ruins of Napata, a city-state of ancient Nubia on the west bank of the Nile River, including the temples of Amun and Mut. The Shaigiya tribe lived around Karima and Korti, but suffered for their support of the British against the Mahdi. The land around Karima is a center for cultivation of Barakawi dates. Karima is a terminus of a branch narrow gauge railway of the Sudan Railways system. Halfway between Karima and El-Kurru there is an area with a large number of petrified trees.

== Climate ==
Karima has a hot desert climate (Köppen climate classification BWh) characterized by high temperatures, extremely low precipitation, and abundant sunshine throughout the year. April through October are extremely hot, with high temperatures routinely exceeding 40 °C (104 °F), while the rest of the year is cooler, with cool nights.

Climate data for Karima (1991–2020 normals, extremes 1961–2020)
Month	Jan	Feb	Mar	Apr	May	Jun	Jul	Aug	Sep	Oct	Nov	Dec	Year
Record high °C (°F)	40.5 (104.9)	41.6 (106.9)	45.5 (113.9)	48.3 (118.9)	49.1 (120.4)	48.3 (118.9)	48.6 (119.5)	47.5 (117.5)	47.2 (117.0)	45.3 (113.5)	41.6 (106.9)	39 (102)	49.1 (120.4)
Mean daily maximum °C (°F)	28.4 (83.1)	31.2 (88.2)	35.1 (95.2)	39.8 (103.6)	42.8 (109.0)	44.0 (111.2)	43.1 (109.6)	42.6 (108.7)	42.8 (109.0)	40.2 (104.4)	34.0 (93.2)	29.7 (85.5)	37.8 (100.0)
Daily mean °C (°F)	20.4 (68.7)	22.6 (72.7)	26.2 (79.2)	30.8 (87.4)	34.3 (93.7)	35.6 (96.1)	35.4 (95.7)	35.5 (95.9)	35.4 (95.7)	32.7 (90.9)	26.3 (79.3)	21.9 (71.4)	29.8 (85.6)
Mean daily minimum °C (°F)	12.5 (54.5)	14.1 (57.4)	17.4 (63.3)	21.8 (71.2)	25.7 (78.3)	27.2 (81.0)	27.8 (82.0)	28.4 (83.1)	28.0 (82.4)	25.1 (77.2)	18.5 (65.3)	14.2 (57.6)	21.7 (71.1)
Record low °C (°F)	3 (37)	3.7 (38.7)	7.5 (45.5)	10 (50)	13.5 (56.3)	18.6 (65.5)	17.4 (63.3)	3.5 (38.3)	19 (66)	13.2 (55.8)	7.7 (45.9)	4.6 (40.3)	3 (37)
Average precipitation mm (inches)	0.0 (0.0)	0.0 (0.0)	0.0 (0.0)	0.0 (0.0)	0.8 (0.03)	0.1 (0.00)	3.5 (0.14)	7.3 (0.29)	2.3 (0.09)	0.6 (0.02)	0.0 (0.0)	0.0 (0.0)	14.7 (0.58)
Average precipitation days (≥ 1.0 mm)	0.0	0.0	0.0	0.0	0.2	0.1	0.5	1.1	0.6	0.1	0.0	0.0	2.5
Average relative humidity (%)	29	22	17	14	15	16	23	27	22	22	27	32	22
Mean monthly sunshine hours	310.0	285.6	303.8	303.0	313.1	288.0	291.4	263.5	267.0	297.6	303.0	316.2	3,542.2
Source: NOAA

== See also ==
- Jebel Barkal
- Napata
- Railway stations in Sudan
