= Temple of Mut, Jebel Barkal =

Temple at Jebel Barkal in Northern State, Sudan

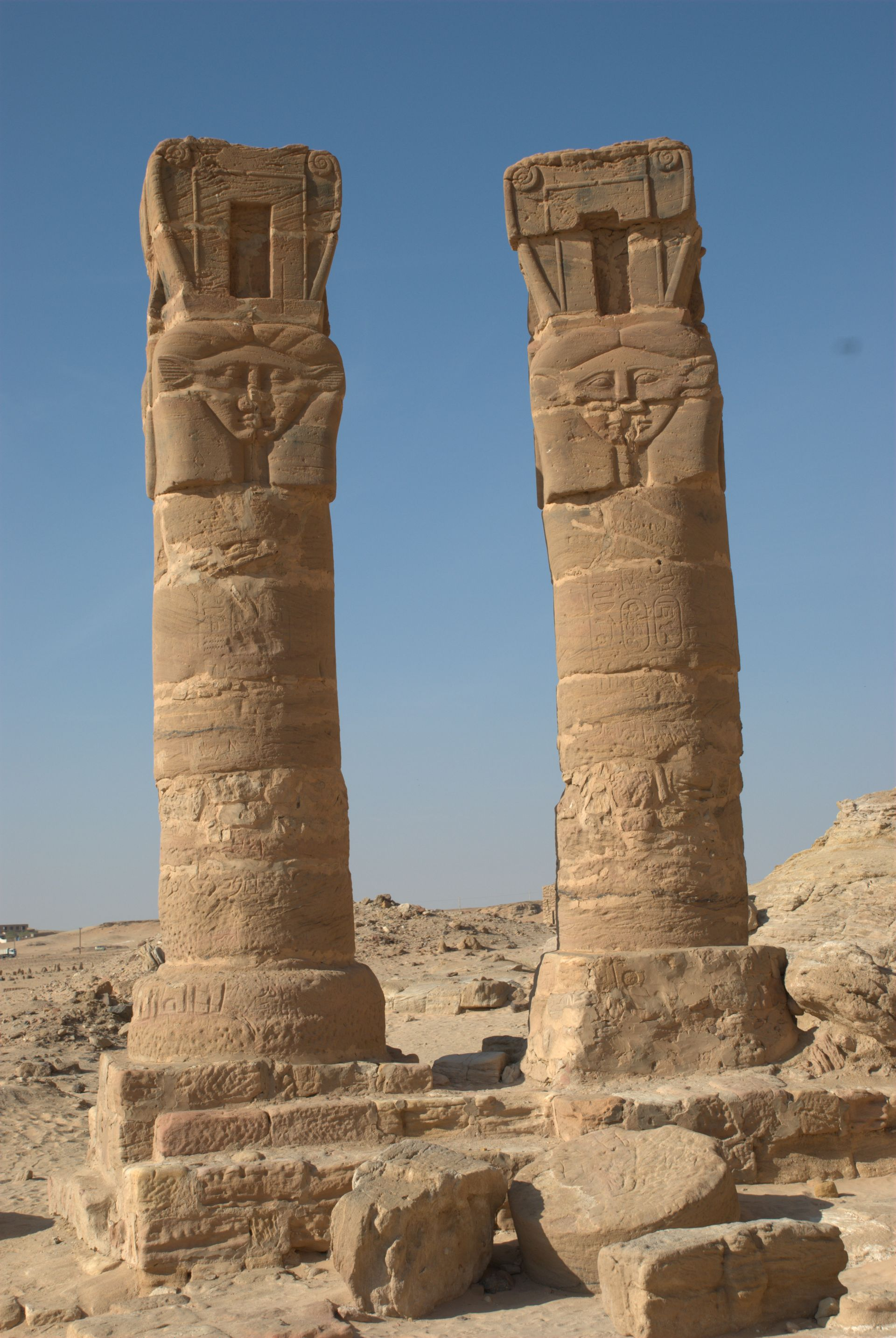
- Hathor columns of the Temple of Mut

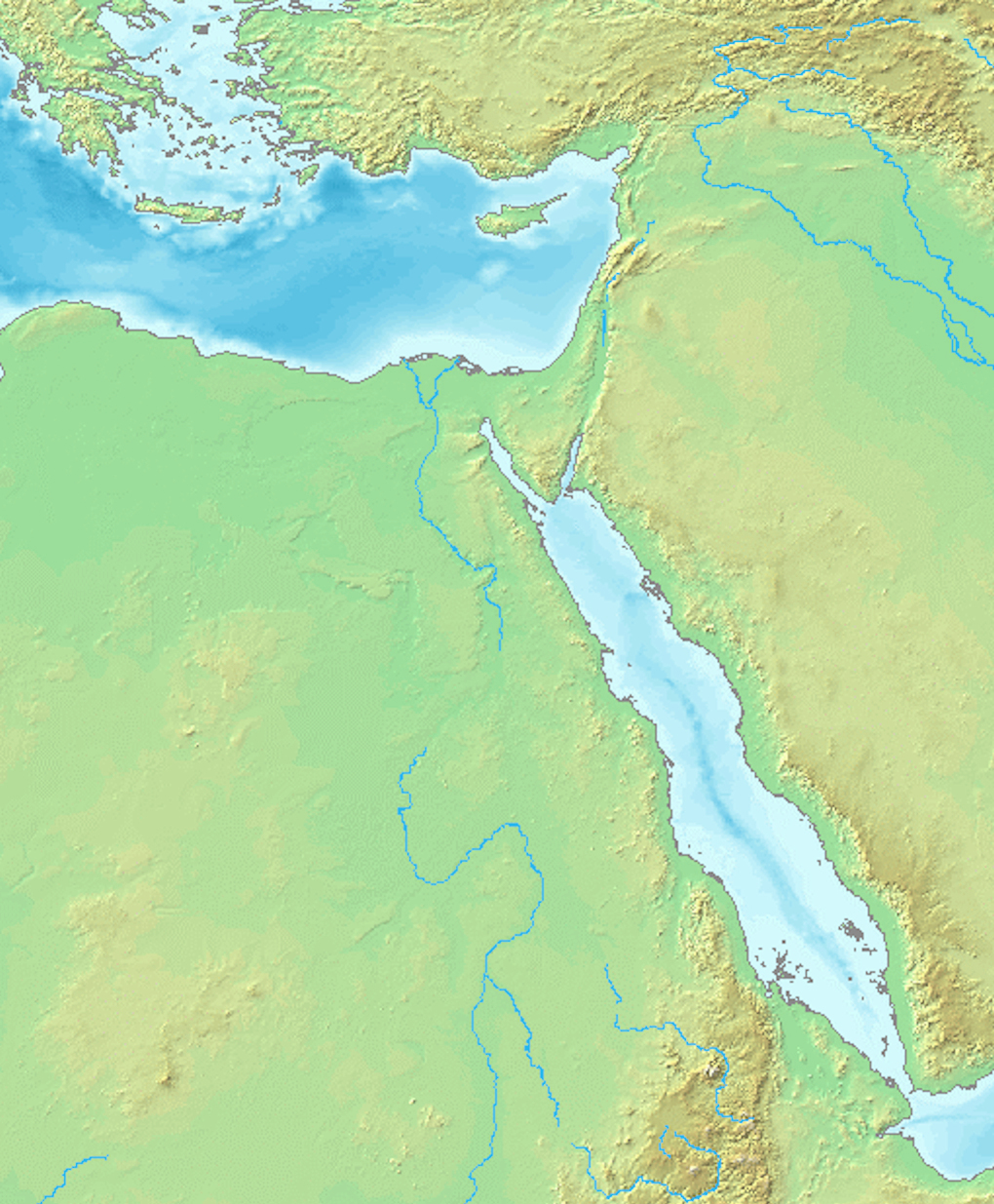
- Location within Northeast Africa Location within Sudan Location within Africa
- 18°32′7″N 31°49′50″E
- Type: Sanctuary
- Location: Karima, Northern State, Sudan
- Region: Nubia
- Part of: Jebel Barkal

History
- Built: 680s BCE
- Built by: Taharqa

UNESCO World Heritage Site
- Official name: Gebel Barkal and the Sites of the Napatan Region
- Type: Cultural
- Criteria: i, ii, iii, iv, vi
- Designated: 2003 (27th session)
- Reference no.: 1073
- Region: Arab States

The Temple of Mut, also named Temple B300, is a temple at Jebel Barkal in Northern State, Sudan. It is situated about 400 km north of Khartoum near Karima and stands near a large bend of the Nile River, in the region that was called Nubia in ancient times. The partially rock-cut temple was built on the west side base of the Jebel Barkal pinnacle, from which angle it assumed the shape of an Uraeus wearing the White Crown of Upper Egypt. Dedicated to the goddess Mut, the wife of Amun, the Temple of Mut was erected by pharaoh Taharqa in the 680s BCE, at a time when he ruled Upper and Lower Egypt.

== History ==
Restoring a ruined structure abandoned by New Kingdom pharaohs, named B300-sub, Taharqa built an outer temple of cut stone masonry comprising entrance kiosk, pylon, Bes pillars, columns topped with sistrum-headed Hathor capitals and carved five wall painted chambers into the rock base to honor the goddess Mut, who believed to dwell together with the state-god Amun inside Jebel Barkal. From the outer structure only two of the Hathor columns still survive, but the rock-cut chambers are in good shape and were cleaned and restored between 2013 and 2020 from the Central Institute of Restoration (ICR) of Italy with National Corporation for Antiquities and Museums of Sudan (NCAM). The project of the restoration of paintings was directed by Laurenti Maria Concetta, and Osman El-Mailk Eglal Mohamed; the safety project was carried out by the architect Claudio Prosperi Porta; and the archaeological excavation conducted by Francesca Iannarilli.Mut Temple publication

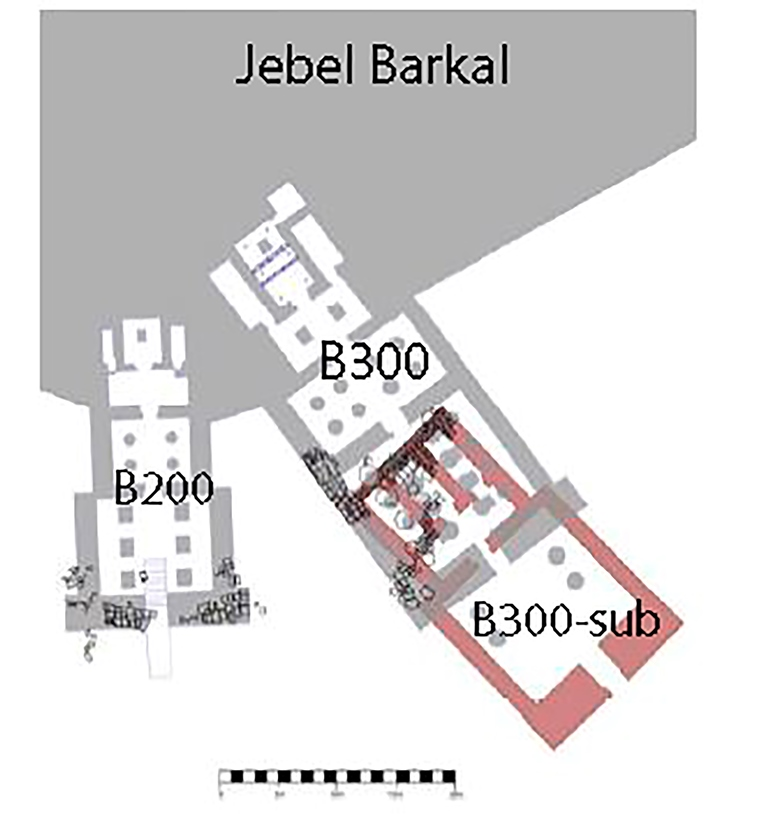
Ground plan of the Temple of Mut.

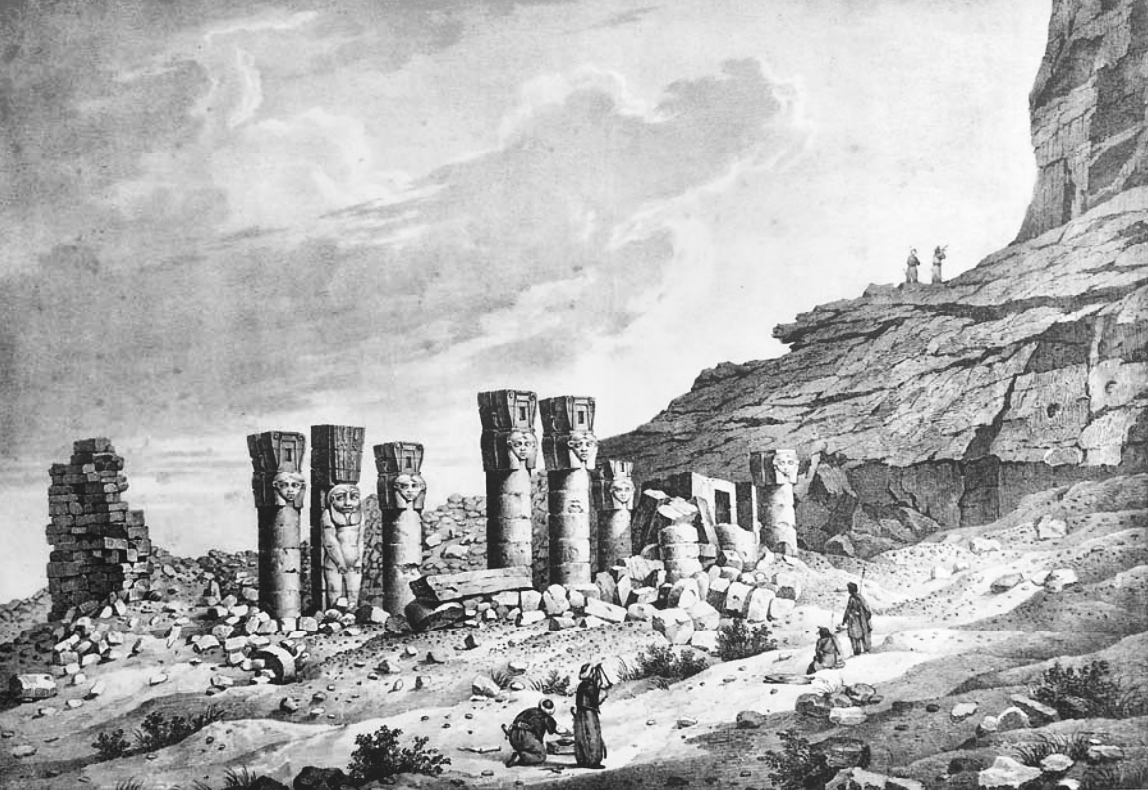
View of the ruins of B 300 in 1821 by Frédéric Cailliaud.

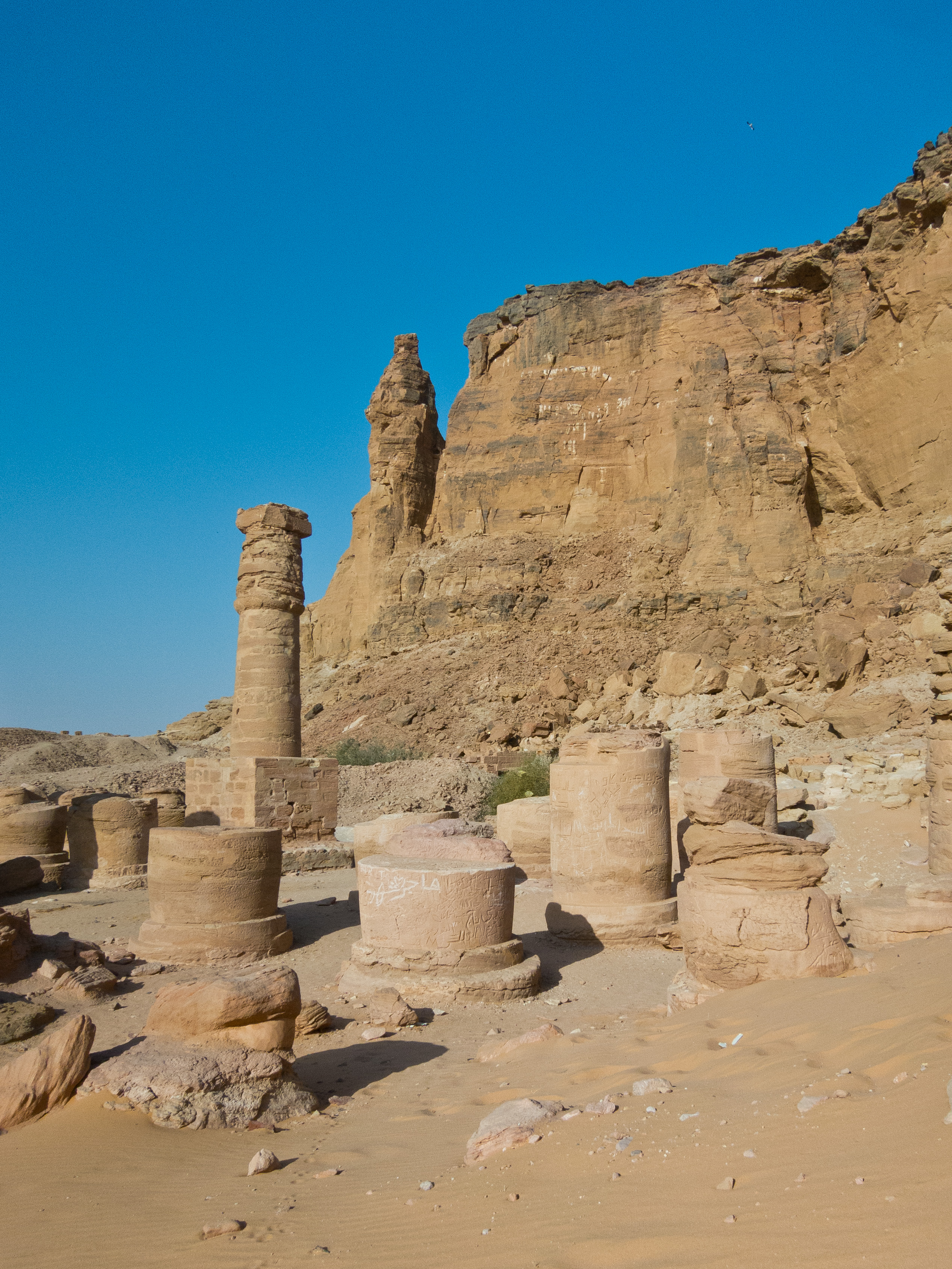
Ruins of the temple of Mut at the foot of Jebel Barkal.

== Setting ==
The rock-chambers contain restored paintings with representations of Amon, Taharqa and lion-headed or human-headed forms of the Double Crown wearing Mut. The paintings are accompanied by hieroglyphic inscriptions, where Taharqa says that he found the temple built by the "ancestors" in "humble work", and that he rebuilt it as "splendid work". The figures are painted in ochre and white kaolin on a background painted in Egyptian blue. Alluding in some regard to the myth of the Eye of Ra, the goddesses represented in the Temple of Mut played important roles both in the myth of the divine origin of the king and in coronation ceremonies.

== Reliefs and paintings ==
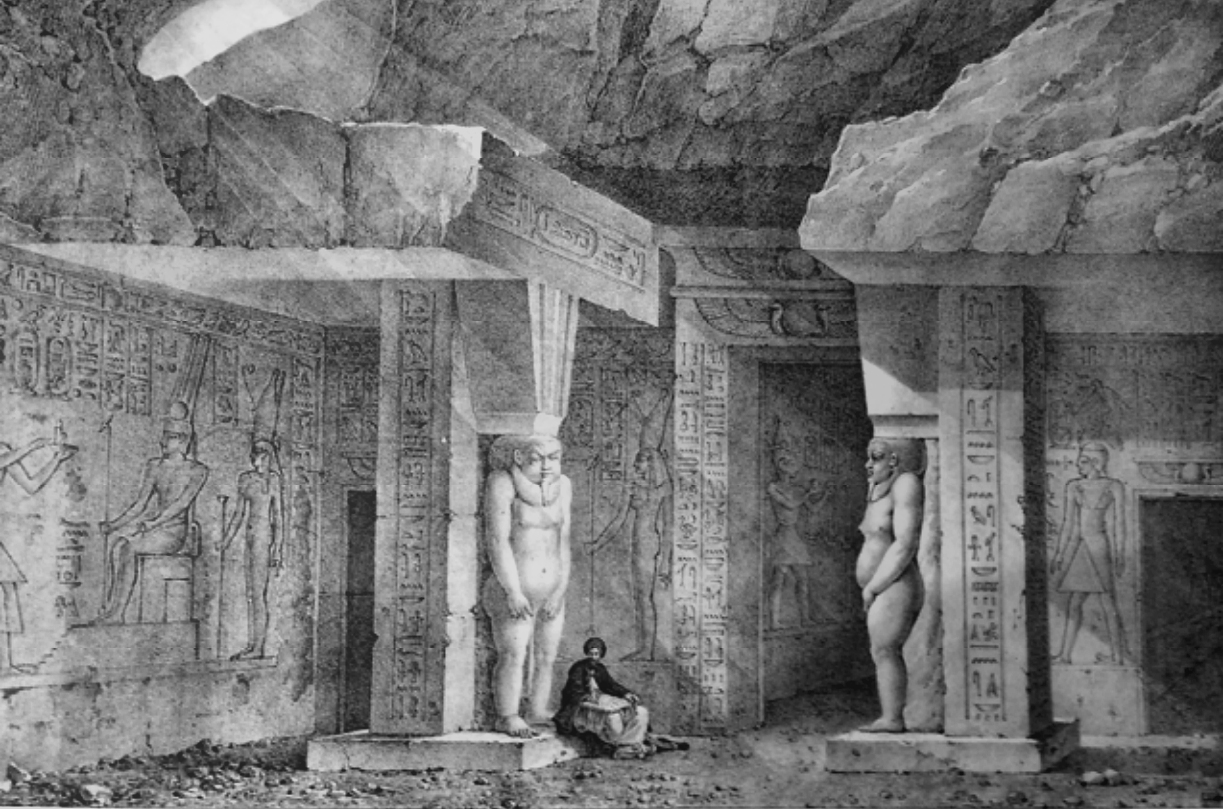
View inside the first rock cut chamber of B 300 as it was in 1821 by Frédéric Cailliaud

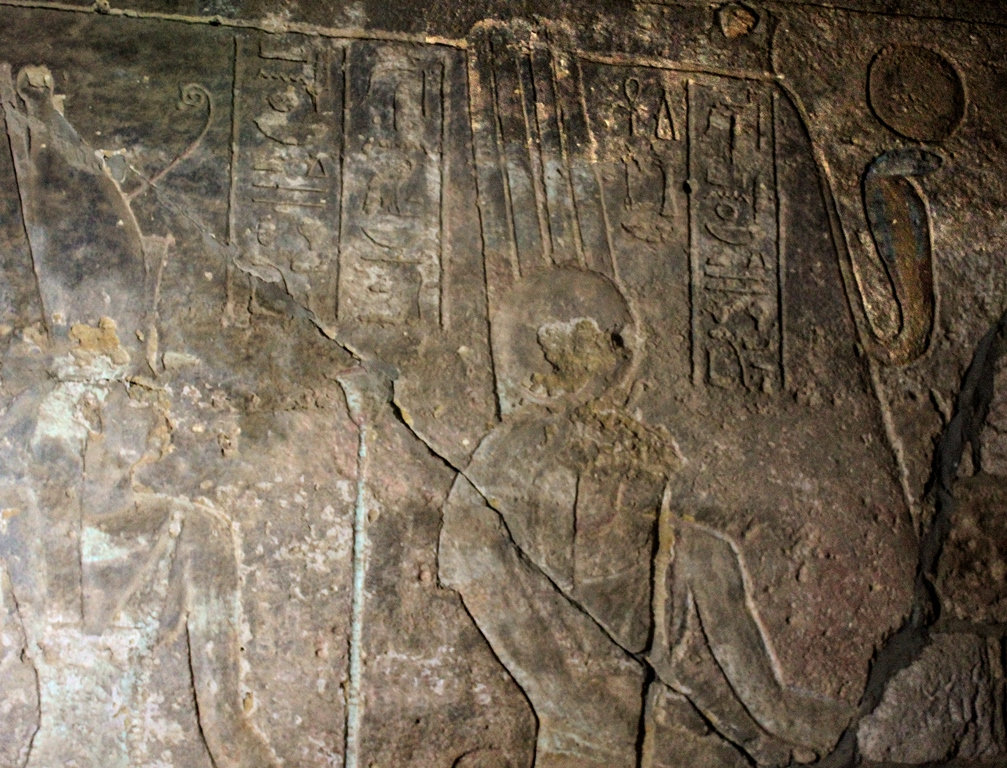
Amun accompanied by Mut with the uraeus-pinnacle shown crowned with a sun disk hanging from the cliff.

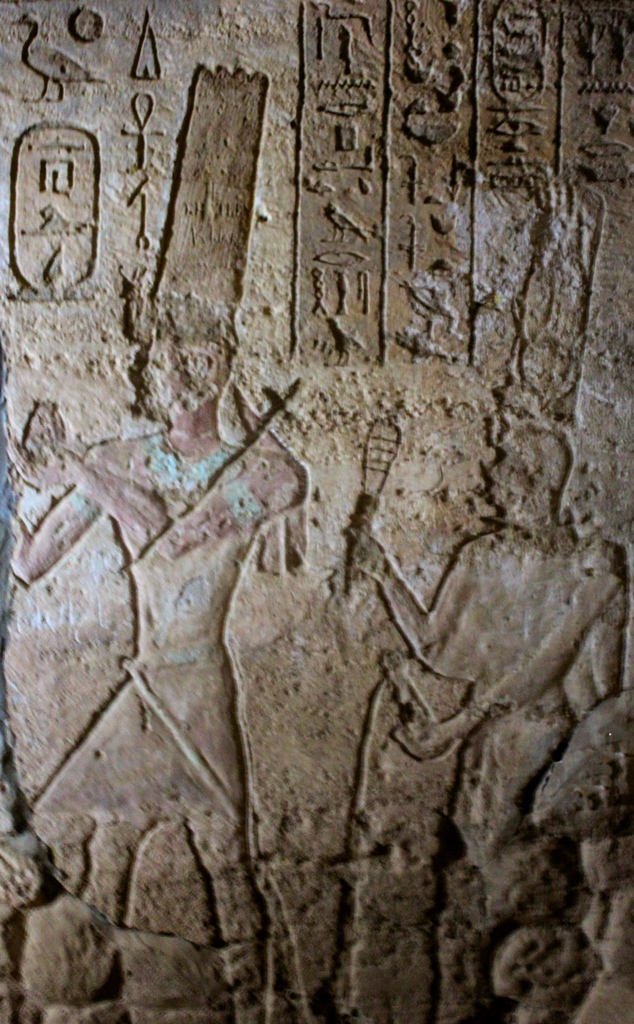
Taharqa, followed by the sistrum shaking queen Takahatenamun.

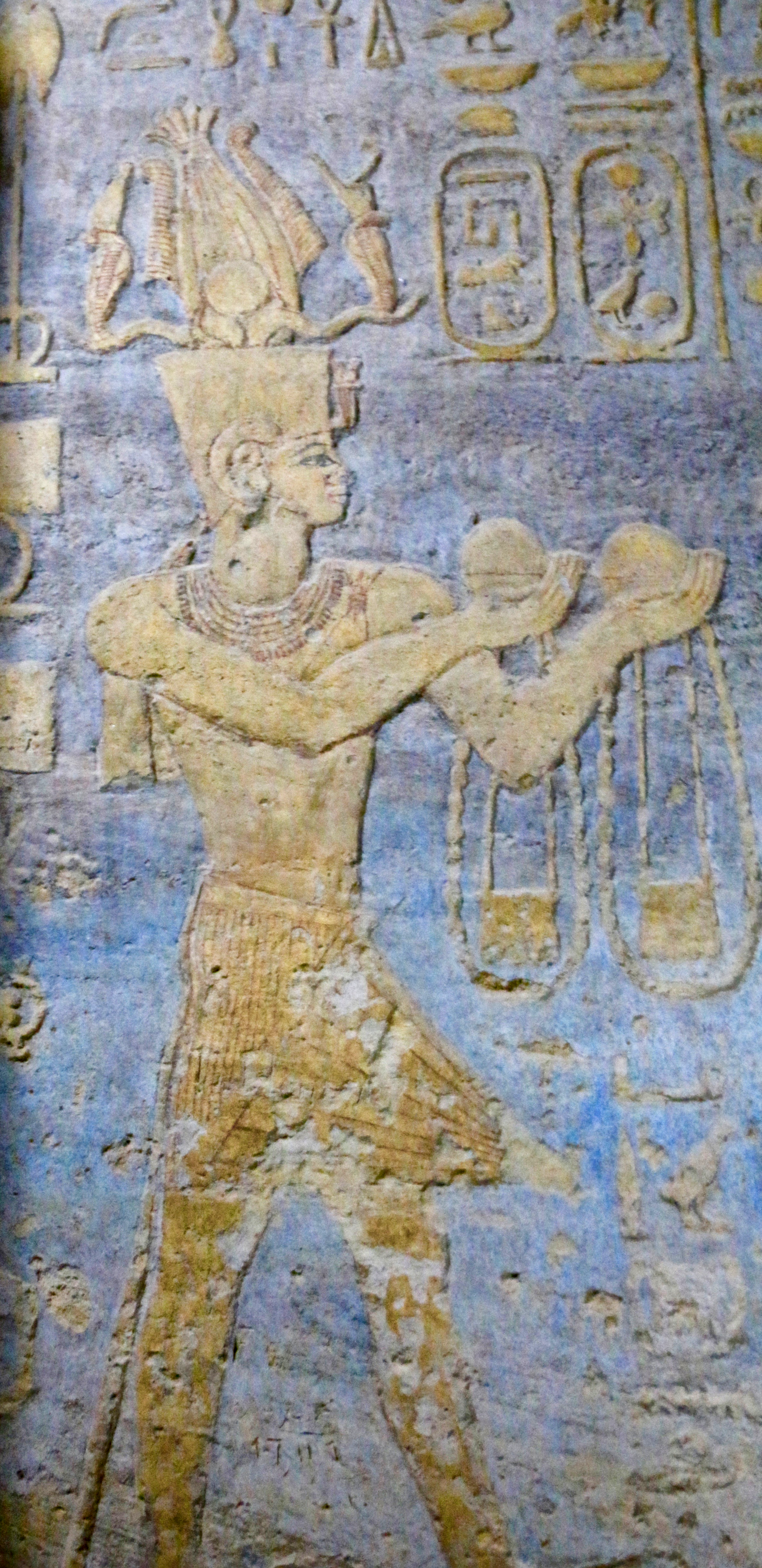
Taharqa in the Temple of Mut.

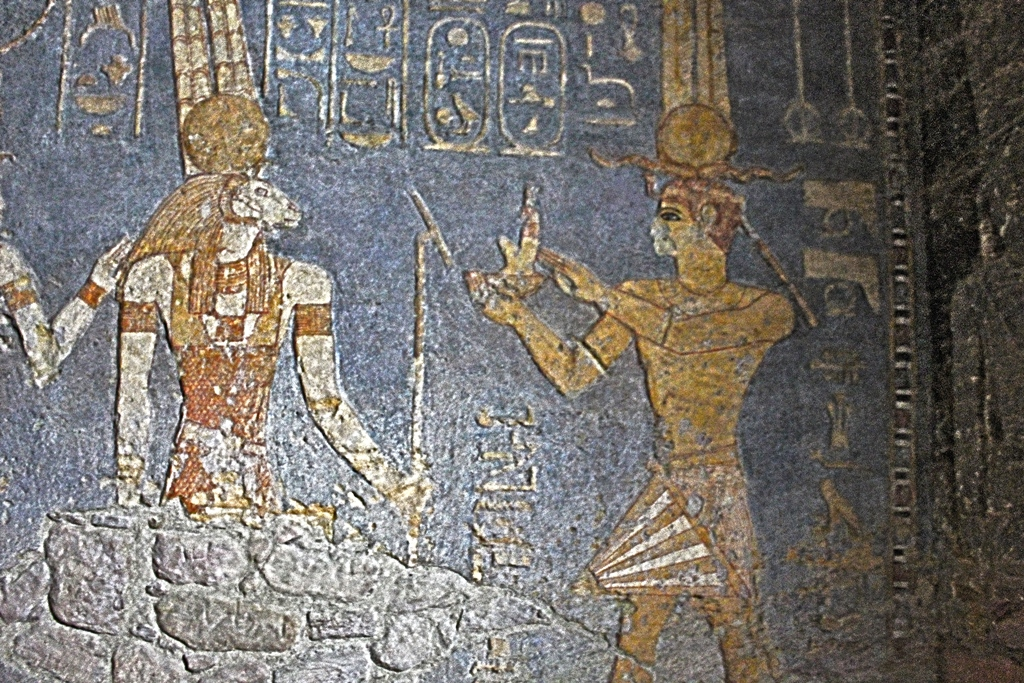
Ram-headed Amun with Taharqa.

== See also ==
- List of ancient Egyptian sites, including sites of temples

== Sources ==
- Kendall, Timothy. A Visitor's Guide to The Jebel Barkal Temples (PDF). Archived from the original (PDF) on 2020-11-26.
