= Ini (pharaoh) =

Egyptian pharaoh

Menkheperre Ini
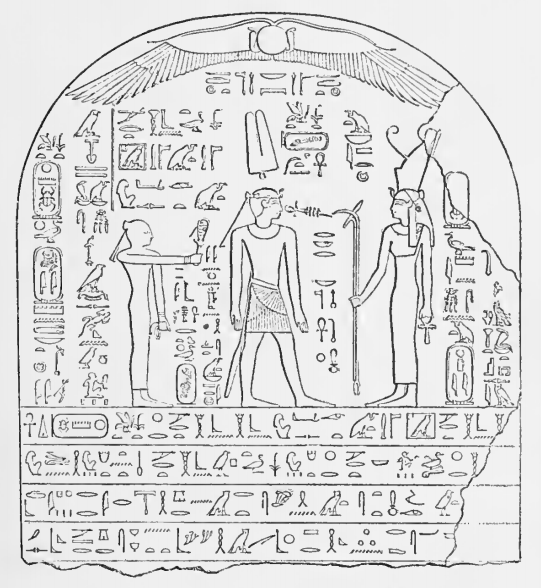
- The poetic stele Louvre C100, drawn by Flinders Petrie.

King of Thebes
- Reign: c. 740 BC
- Predecessor: Rudamun or Shoshenq VII ?
- Successor: Piye?
Royal titulary
Horus name
Sema-tawy
Sm3-t3.wj
He who unifies the two lands
G5	F36 N17 N17
Nebty name
Mesi-hemwt
Msj-ḥmw.t
Creator of the arts
G16	ms U25
Golden Horus
Bik nbw sasha qenw
Sˁš3-qn.w
Multiplier of warriors
G8	z I1 q n nw w A12 Z2
Prenomen
Menkheperre
Mn-ḫpr-Rˁ
Enduring is the apparition of Ra

M23 X1 L2 X1	ra xpr mn
Nomen
Ini
S3 Rˁ Jnj
Son of Ra, Ini

G39 N5	W25 i i
- Dynasty: 23rd Dynasty

Menkheperre Ini (or Iny Si-Ese Meryamun) was an Egyptian king reigning at Thebes during the 8th century BC following the last king of the 23rd Dynasty, Rudamun.

== Attestations ==
Menkheperre Ini was probably Rudamun's successor at Thebes but was not a member of his predecessor's 23rd dynasty. Unlike the 23rd dynasty rulers, he was a local king who ruled only at Thebes for at least 4–5 years after the death of Rudamun. His existence was first revealed with the publication of a dated Year 5 graffito at an Egyptian temple by Helen Jacquet-Gordon in 1979. Prior to 1989, he was conventionally attested by only three documents:

- Graffito No. 11 which dates to Year 5 III Shemu day 10 of an "Iny Si-Ese Meryamun" on the roof of Khonsu Temple (as noted by Jacquet-Gordon);
- A bronze plaque in Durham University which preserves his nomen: "Son of Re Iny"; and
- A shard from Abydos.

Then in 1989, Jean Yoyotte published an important new study on Ini/Iny's reign in a CRIPEL 11 paper. Below is a partial English summary of his article by Chris Bennett:

Engraved on a bronze plaque in Durham (N 2186) is the cartouche of the 'Son of Re Iny'. This is surely the same individual as the 'Pharaoh Iny' known from Graffito no 11 of the Temple of Khonsu (AEB 79244) where his Vth year is cited. A shard (now lost) from Amélineau's work at Abydos bears perhaps another reference to the same king. H. Jacquet-Gordon has shown that the accession of this enigmatic king can be dated c. 780/770 BC or 753/743 BC (calculated here from Table 6 in AEB 86.0470). There exists, however no epigraphic evidence that to prove that the king Mn-hpr-R' [...]y of the famous poetic stele Louvre C100 and of the calcite jar Cairo CG 18498 is in fact the Kushite Pi['ankh]y (so AEB 69061); on the contrary, the reconstruction [In]y is perfectly acceptable here. Some remarks ensue concerning the use of 'imperial' and old-fashioned royal titularies, and also archaizing bas-reliefs, during the late TIPE. In this context, the titulary of Iny, which is formally archaizing, can be seen as expressing an ambitious project....two very unusual epithets of Iny — 'Creator of the Arts' and 'Multiplier of...Warriors' — could also suggest a 'Revolutionary' aspect held by this figure, who was apparently an outsider amongst the Theban 'Sons of Isis Beloved of Amun" of the 23rd Dynasty.

== Identity ==
Yoyotte's proposed identification of Menkheperre as the prenomen of King Ini/Iny, was based on his examination of the surviving traces of this king's nomen in the Louvre stela which he believed conformed better with the name Iny than the Nubian Dynasty 25 ruler Pi(ankh)y/Piye. His arguments here are today accepted by virtually all Egyptologists including Jürgen von Beckerath in the latter's 1999 book on royal Egyptian kings' names.

It had been previously suggested that Menkheperre was a prenomen or royal title for Piye but this is undermined by the fact that the Nubian king is known to have employed two other prenomens during his lifetime: Usimare and Sneferre. Barring this, Ini was only a local king of Thebes who ruled Egypt concurrently with Peftjaubast of Herakleopolis and Nimlot of Hermopolis. Ini may have been deposed around Piye's year 20 invasion of Egypt since he does not appear in the latter's year 21 Gebel Barkal Victory stela, but this hypothesis remains to be proven because Piye could well have permitted Ini to remain in power as king of Thebes. In this case, Ini would have been a Nubian vassal in Thebes. Evidence to this effect includes the name of king Ini's daughter, Mutirdis (TT410), and the style of Louvre stela C100 which Kenneth Kitchen dated to the early 25th Nubian Dynasty period. However, all three of Ini's nomen cartouche on his Louvre C100 stela were erased and his figure was partly damaged which may imply that Piye's successor Shabaka removed Ini from power and carried out a damnatio memoriae campaign against his monuments. This would justify the view that Graffito No. 11 was carved not long before the establishment of full Kushite dominion over Egypt by Shabaka who would not have tolerated a native Egyptian king in the important city of Thebes which would pose a threat to the authority of the 25th Nubian dynasty.

Preceded by Rudamun?	Pharaoh; Twenty-third dynasty of Egypt	Succeeded by Piye?
