= Nastasen =

Kushite King of Meroe from 335 to 315/310 BCE

Nastasen Ankhkhare
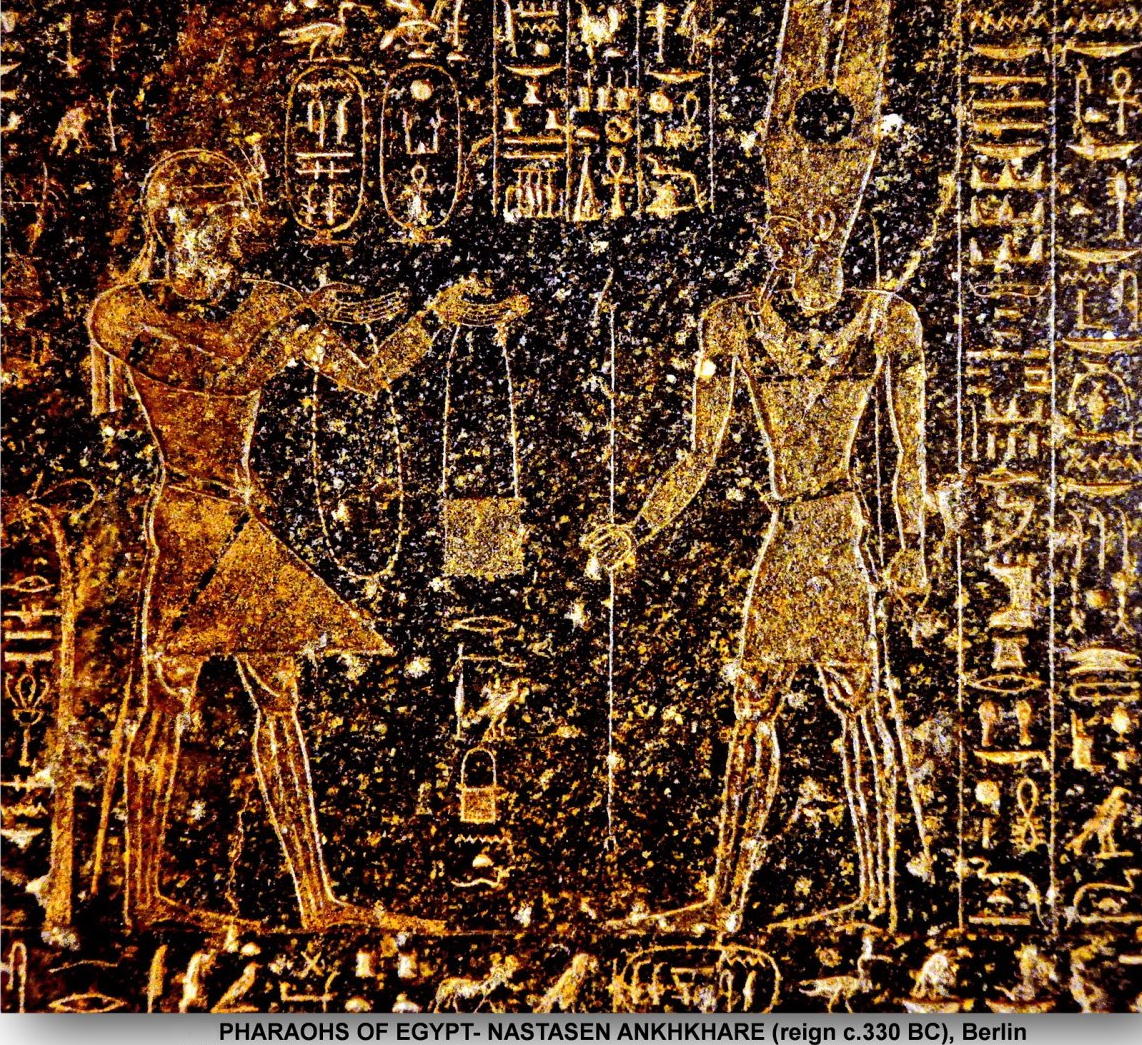
- Nastasen (left) making an offering to Amun-Ra

Kushite King of Meroë
- Reign: 335-315/310 BCE
Royal titulary
Prenomen
Ankhkare

M23 X1 L2 X1	N5 D28 S34
Nomen
Nastasen

G39 N5	n i s N18 z M23 M23
- Consort: Sekhmakh
- Father: Harsiotef ?
- Mother: Pelkha
- Died: 315/310 BCE
- Burial: Nuri 15

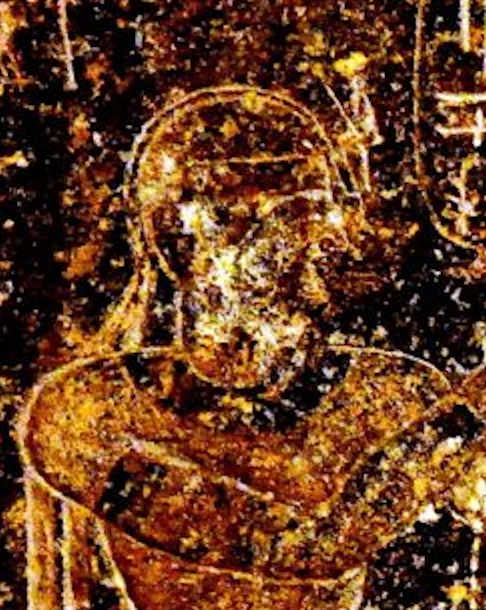
Portrait of Nastasen, with Kushite crown

Nastasen was a king of Kush who ruled the Kingdom of Kush from 335 to 315/310 BCE. According to a stela from Dongola, his mother was named Queen Pelkha and his father may have been King Harsiotef. His successor was Aryamani.

== Biography ==
Nastasen is known from three types of objects. There is a stela with a long historical inscription, a silver handle of a mirror, and several shabti-figures. The mirror handle and the shabti were found in a pyramid at Nuri (Nu. 15), which was obviously his burial place. He was the last Kushite king to be buried in the royal cemetery at Napata.

The 1.63-metre-high (5.3 ft) granite stela was found at New Dongola and is now in the Egyptian Museum of Berlin (Inv. no. 2268). Originally, it was most likely placed in the Amun temple of Jebel Barkal. In the upper part appear the pictures and name of his mother, Pelkha, and his wife, Sekhmakh, next to the king.

During his reign, Nastasen defeated an invasion of Kush from Upper Egypt. Nastasen's monument calls the leader of this invasion Kambasuten, a likely local variation of Khabbash. Khabbash was a local ruler of Upper Egypt who had campaigned against the Persians around 338 BC. His invasion of Kush was a failure, and Nastasen claimed to have taken many fine boats and other war prizes during his victory.

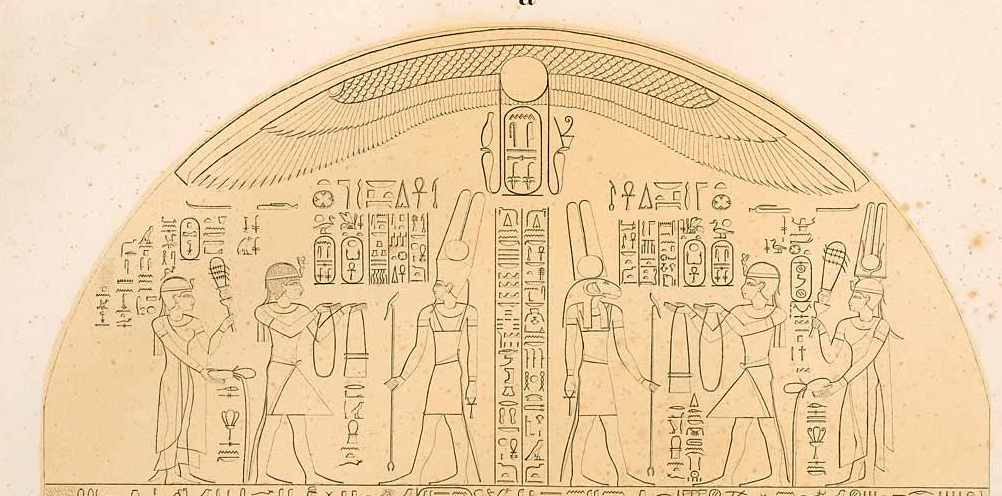
King Nastasen accompanied by his mother Queen Pelkha (left) and his wife Queen Sakhmakh (right)

== Tomb excavation ==
The first archaeological attempt of an excavation of the tomb occurred in 1913, but due to the flooded chambers, the team abandoned the effort after only having uncovered a shabti to confirm the identity of Nastasen. It is assumed that because the tomb still had gold lying directly on the floor of the chamber, that the flooding of the Nile has prevented the tomb from being a target of graverobbers.

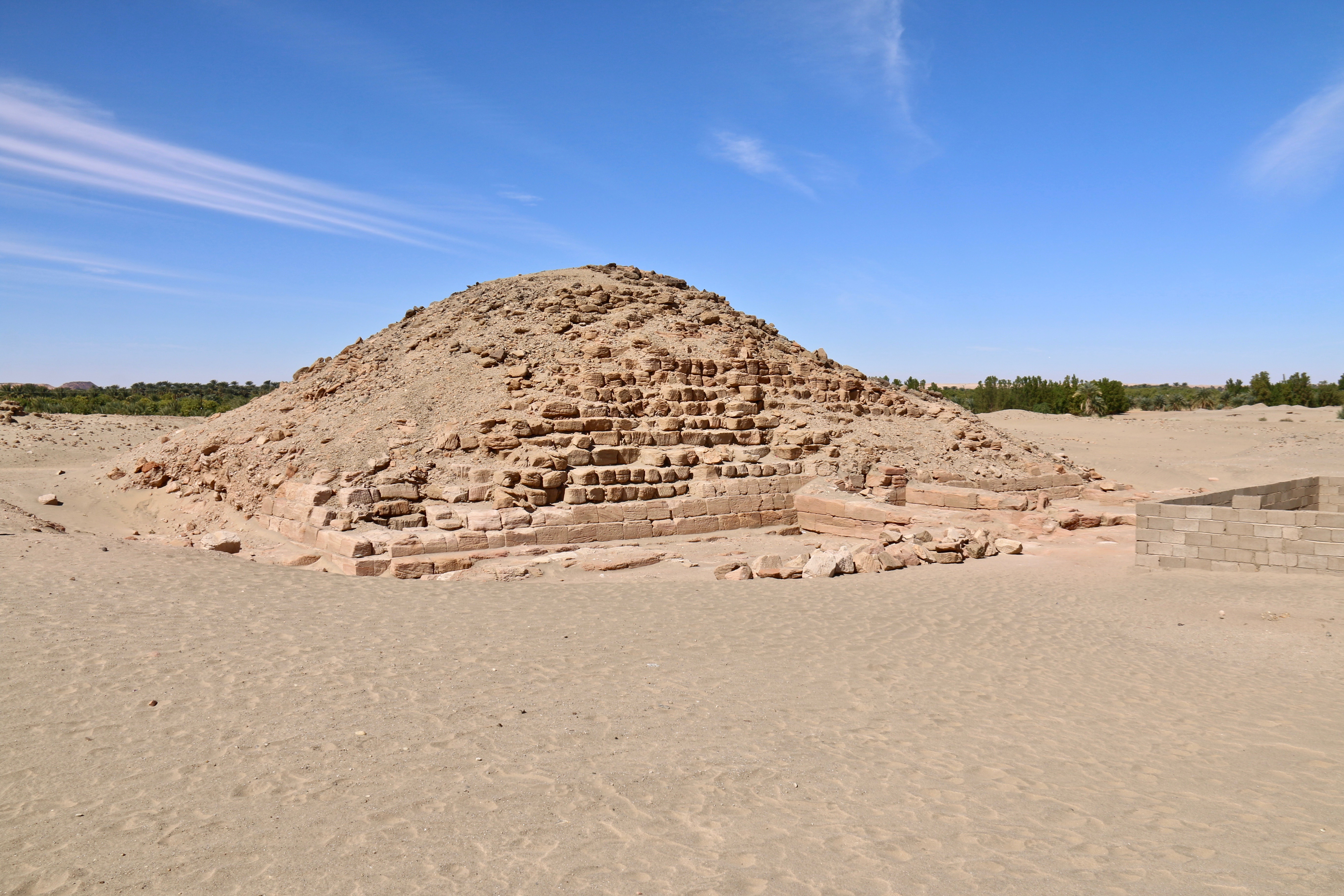
Nastasen's pyramid, Nuri, Sudan

The tomb of Nastasen is among several in Nuri that are slated for excavation by archaeologist Pearce Paul Creasman and his Nuri Archaeological Expedition using underwater archaeological methods. That is necessary because of rising ground waters in what was the 4th cataract Nubian region. These tombs are under the pyramids and have flooded. Excavation reports of his tomb indicate that it was undisturbed by grave robbers.

Explorer Josh Gates participated in a dive with Professor Creasman, which was featured in a May 2023 episode of Expedition Unknown (season 11, episodes 1 & 2 which aired May 24th & 31st). Among the finds uncovered on the dives were gold leaf, and a bone fragment in a gold toe cap, assumed to be from Nastasen.

National Geographic has sponsored and produced a series entitled Flooded Tombs of the Nile, in which the tomb of Nastasen is excavated in the first episode.

== Sources ==
- Fage, J.D.; Oliver, Roland (1975). The Cambridge History of Africa Volume 2: From C.500 BC to AD1050. Cambridge: Cambridge University Press. p. 858. ISBN 0-521-21592-7.
- Török, László, in: Fontes Historiae Nubiorum, II, Bergen 1996, 467-501, ISBN 82-91626-01-4
