= Takahatenamun =

Nubian queen

Takahatenamun in hieroglyphs
< i mn n D37 V31 O4 t >
- King’s Wife and King's Sister of Taharqa
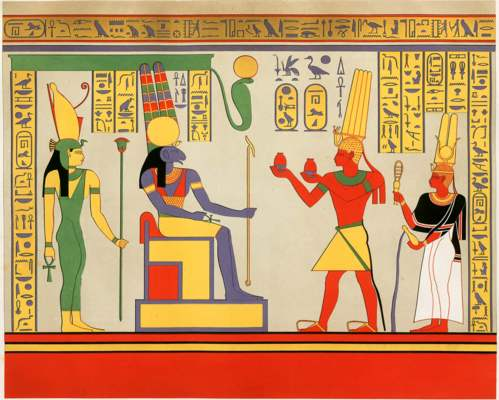
- Taharqa followed by Queen Takahatamun at Gebel Barkal

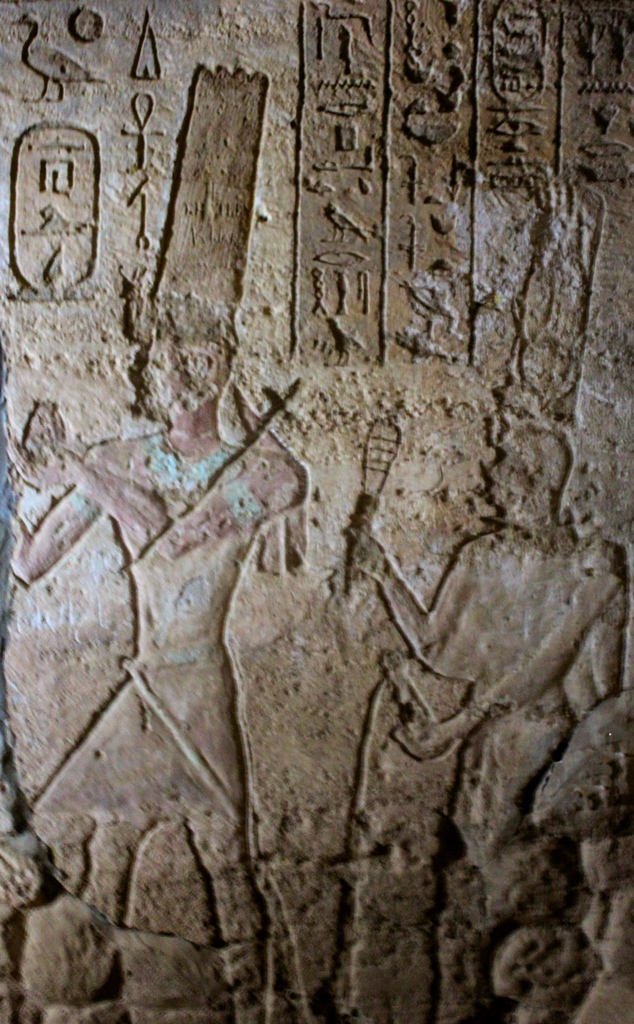
Gebel Barkal, Temple of Mut: Taharqa, followed by the sistrum shaking queen Takahatamun making offerings to Amun and Mut.

Takahatenamun (Takahatamun, Takhahatamani) was a Nubian queen dated to the Twenty-fifth Dynasty of Egypt.

== Family ==
Takahat(en)amun was the daughter of King Piye and the sister-wife of King Taharqa. She held several titles: Noble Lady (iryt p't), Great of Praises (wrt hzwt), King's Wife (hmt niswt), Lady of All Women (hnwt hmwt nbwt), and King's Sister (snt niswt).

== Attestations ==
Takahat(en)amun is known from a temple scene of the temple of Mut in Gebel Barkal where she is shown standing behind Taharqa who is offering to Amun-Re and Mut.

George Andrew Reisner proposed that Takatamun might have been buried in Nuri in Tomb 21. The tomb is dated, however, to the time of King Senkamanisken, meaning that the queen would have had to have died in her seventies or later if she were buried there.
