= Djehutyemhat =

Egyptian ruler of Hermopolis

- Thotemhat, Thutemhat
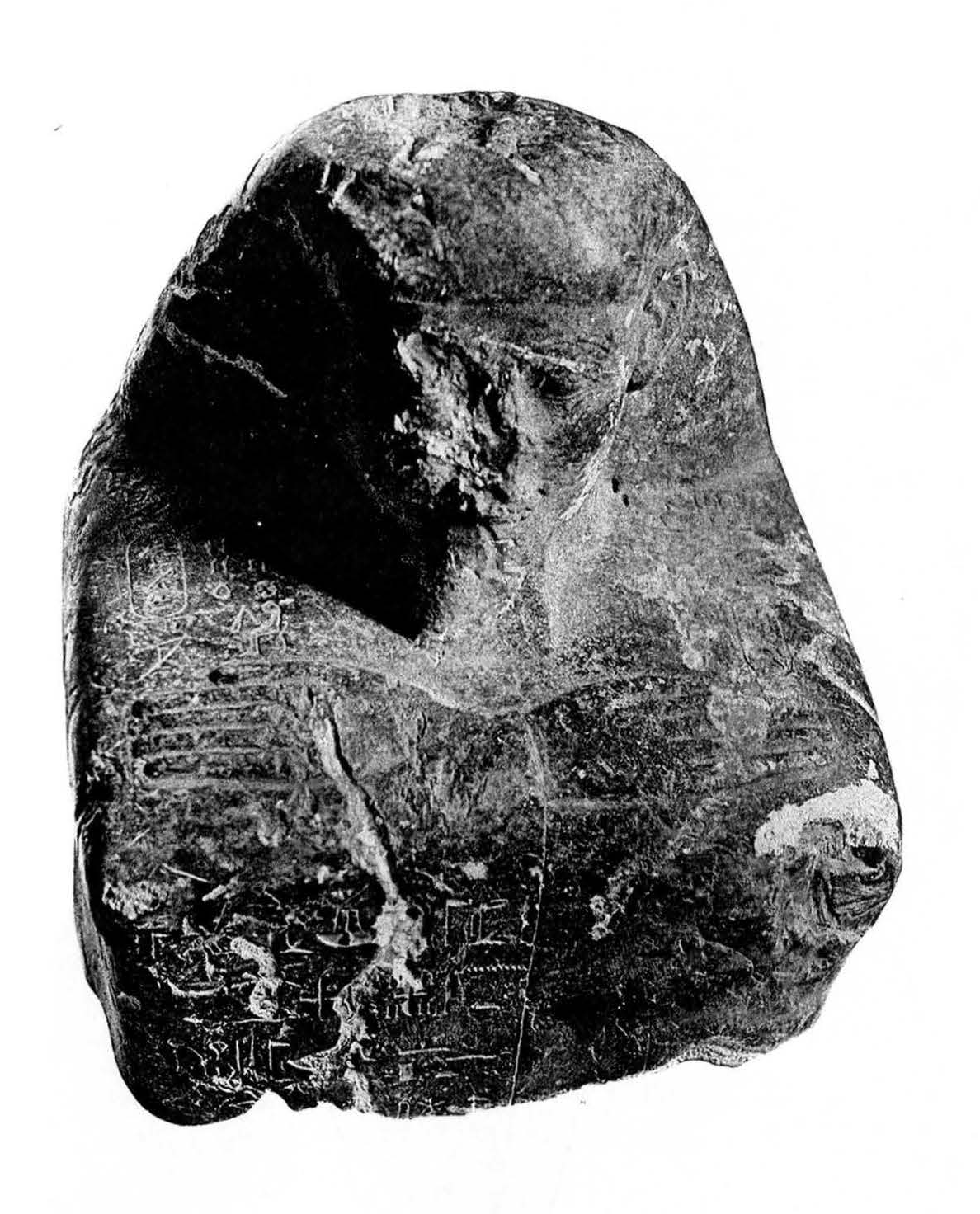
- Statue of the priest Tjanhesret, bearing the cartouches of Djehutyemhat. Cairo Museum, CG 42212.

King of Hermopolis
- Reign: c. 725 - 710 BCE
- Predecessor: Nimlot
- Successor: Pedinemty?
Royal titulary
Horus name
Khaiemwenet
Ḫˁj-m-Wn(t)
He who appears in Wenet (Note: Wenet was the 15th nome of Upper Egypt, with Hermopolis as capital.)
G5	N28 G17 E34 N24
Prenomen
Neferkheperre Khaikhau
Nfr-ḫpr-Rˁ-ḫˁj-ḫˁ(w)
Perfect is the manifestation of Ra, with shiny crown/appearance

M23 X1 L2 X1	N5 L1 nfr N28 N28
Nomen
Djehutyemhat
Ḏḥwtj m ḥ3t
Thoth is in the front

G39 N5	G26 G17 F4

Djehutyemhat,,also can be spelled as Thotemhat, or Thutemhat, was an ancient Egyptian ruler ("king") of Hermopolis during the 25th Dynasty.

== Biography ==
Like his probable predecessor Nimlot, he proclaimed himself king, adopting the full royal titulary although he was no more than a governor of Hermopolis and a vassal of the Kushite 25th Dynasty. His cartouches appear carved on the shoulders of a damaged block statue depicting the priest Tjanhesret, found in Luxor in 1909 and now in the Cairo Museum (CG 42212), and on a bronze naos-shaped amulet of Amun-Ra of unknown provenance – possibly from Thebes – and now in the British Museum (EA11015). The only known depiction of the king is found on a votive scribal pallet now in the collection of the Egypt Centre of Swansea University.

British Egyptologist Kenneth Kitchen has suggested that the successor of Djehutyemhat could have been the poorly known "king" Pedinemty.
