= Sekhmakh =

4th-century BC Nubian queen consort

- Queen consort of Meroë; King's Daughter; King's Wife; Mistress of Egypt
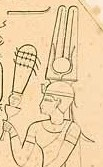
- Detail of Sekhmakh from the stela of Nastasen

Queen regnant of Meroë?
- Reign: ???? BC – ???? BC
- Spouse: Nastasen
- Father: Harsiotef?

< z x mA x >
Sekhmakh
Sḫ m3ḫ
in hieroglyphs

Sekhmakh was the wife of the Nubian king Nastasen, who ruled in the 4th century BC.

Sekhmakh is known from the great stela of the king, where she is depicted in the roundel. She is also known from her funerary stela, found in a temple at Jebel Barkal and obviously reused. The burial, where the stela was once placed is unknown. Sekhmakh bears the titles king's daughter, king's wife and mistress of Egypt. Her royal parents are unknown.

Sekhmakh had a Horus name and is referred to as "king" on a stela from Jebel Barkal, possibly indicating that she was a queen regnant or had some kind of role that was a precursor to the reigning queens of Meroë.

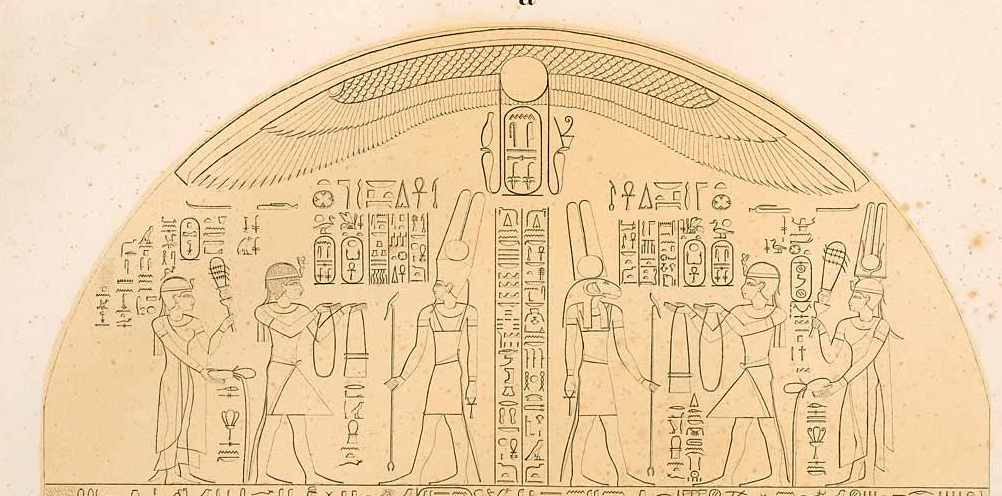
King Nastasen making offerings to the gods with his mother Pelkha (left) and his wife Sekhmakh (far right).

== Literature ==
- Laszlo Török, in: Fontes Historiae Nubiorum, Vol. II, Bergen 1996, 468, ISBN 978-82-91626-01-7
