= Harsiotef =

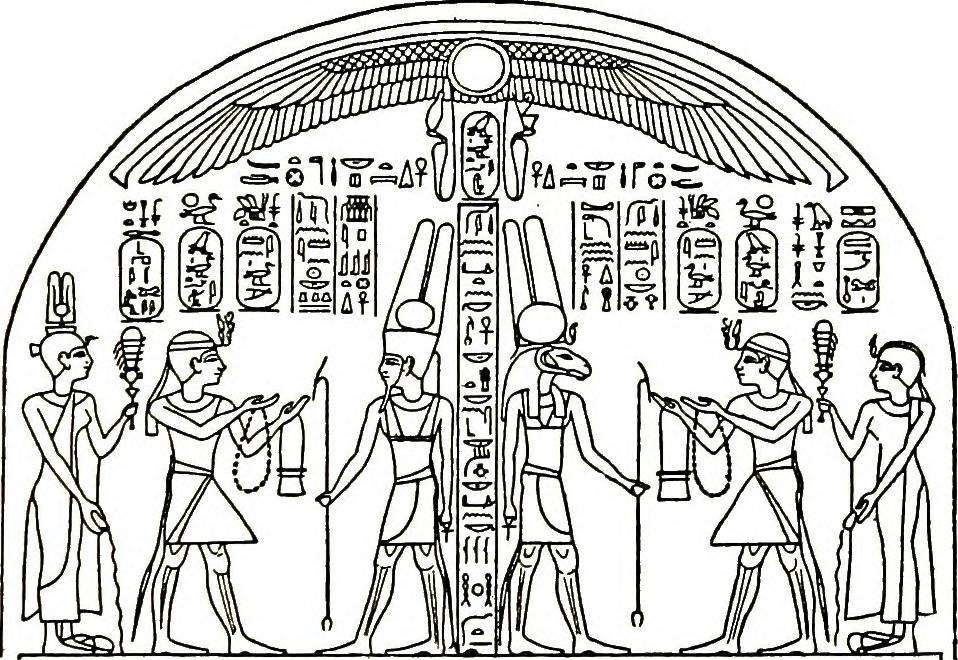
- Stela of Harsiotef offering to Amun-Ra

Kushite King of Meroë
- Reign: c. 404-369 BCE
- Predecessor: Baskakeren
- Successor: King, owner of pyramid 1 at El-Kurru?
Royal titulary
Horus name
Kanakht Khaemnepet ("Mighty Bull appears in Napata")
Nebty name
Nednetjeru ("Who seeks the council of Gods")
Golden Horus
Uftikhesutnebut ("Subduer given all the Desert Lands")
Prenomen
Sameryamun ("Beloved son of Amun")
Nomen
Harsiotef ("Horus Son of his Father")

G39 N5	G5 G39 Z1 i t f A40
- Consorts: Queen Batahaliye and possibly Queen Pelkha, Henutirdis ?
- Children: Possibly King Akhraten, King Nastasen, Queen Sakhmakh
- Father: Likely King Amanineteyerike
- Mother: Queen Atasamale
- Died: c. 369 BCE
- Burial: Nuri (Nu. 13)

Harsiotef was a Kushite King of Meroë (about 404 – 369 BC).

Harsiotef took on a full set of titles based on those of the Egyptian Pharaohs:

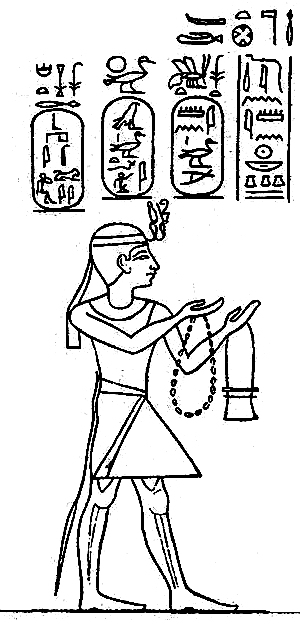
Stela of Harsiotef, showing Harsiotef making offerings to the Gods

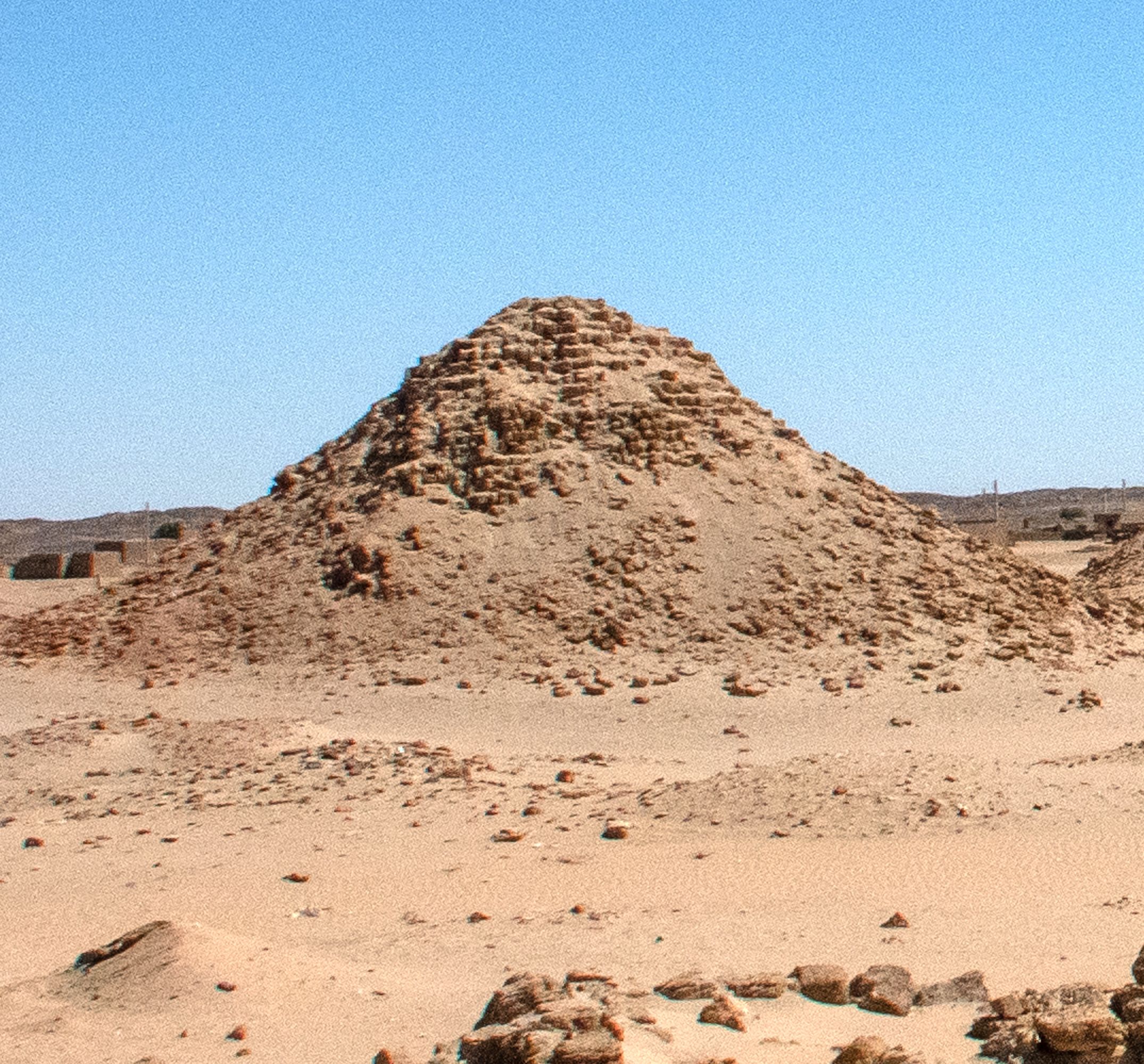
Nuri pyramid Nu XIII of King Harsiotef

Harsiotef was the son of Queen Atasamale and likely of King Amanineteyerike. He had a wife named Queen Batahaliye and may have had another wife named Queen Pelkha. If Queen Pelkha was his wife, he would also be the father of King Nastasen. It is possible that King Akhraten was also a son of Harsiotef, and Queen Sakhmakh, the wife of Nastasen, may be his daughter.

He left an inscription dated to his thirty-third regnal year, listing the battles from his successful campaign east of his kingdom against a town called Habasa, whose inhabitants were called Matit. As a result of his victory, the Matit agreed to pay tribute to him.

The name of this place may be the earliest recorded use of the word Habesha, the etymological basis for English Abyssinia. The only earlier text which may refer to the term is the mention of a "foreign people from the incense-producing regions" called ḫbstjw during Queen Hatshepsut's time, which scholars assume refers to the land of Punt and the Habesha.

Matit is recorded in the reigns of both Harsiotef and Nastasen. The people of Matit or Matata also fought against the Aksumite king Ezana centuries later.

Harsiotef was buried in a pyramid at Nuri (Nu. 13).
