= Batahaliye =

Wife and the sister of Nubian king Harsiotef

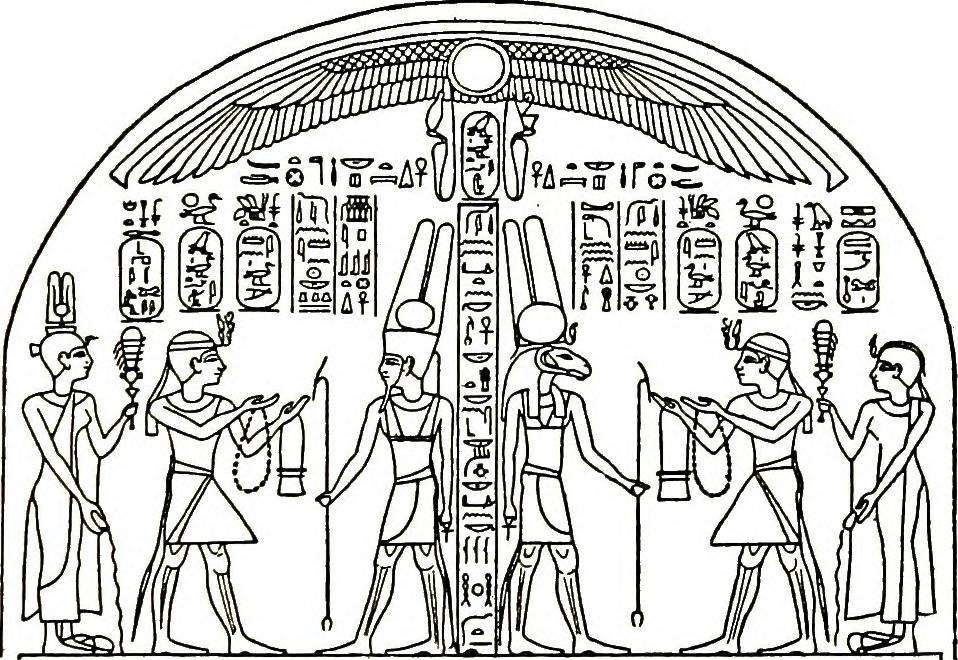
Batahaliye on the stela of king Harsiotef. She is depicted on the very left

Batahaliye was the wife and the sister of Nubian king Harsiotef (ruled very roughly around 400 BC). She is known from stela of her husband and from her burial at Nuri. Her main title was big king's wife, Hmt-niswt aAt. (not great king's wife as usually). Other titles are king's wife and king's sister.

She is also known from her burial at Nuri. The latter consisted of a pyramid with a chapel and two underground burial chambers. There was a staircase going underground and leading to two rooms. The burial was found robbed, but fragments of uninscribed shabtis were found. Here was also found a stela showing Batahaliye in front of the Underworld god Osiris The inscriptions there are made in Egyptian hieroglyphs, but the texts are hard to read.
