= Temple of Amun, Jebel Barkal =

Sudanese temple

Temple of Amun
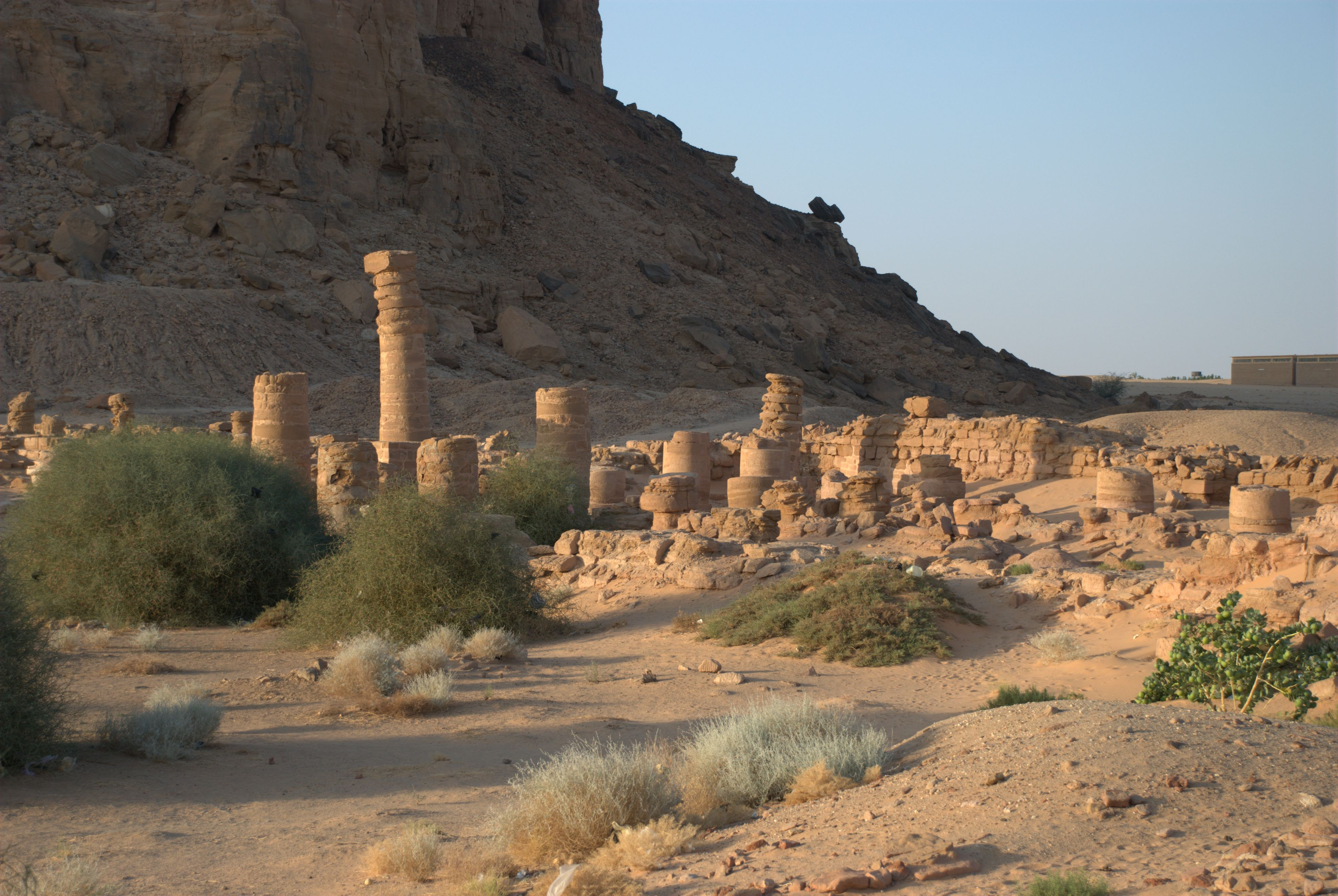
- Southwest view of Amun Temple at Jebel Barkal

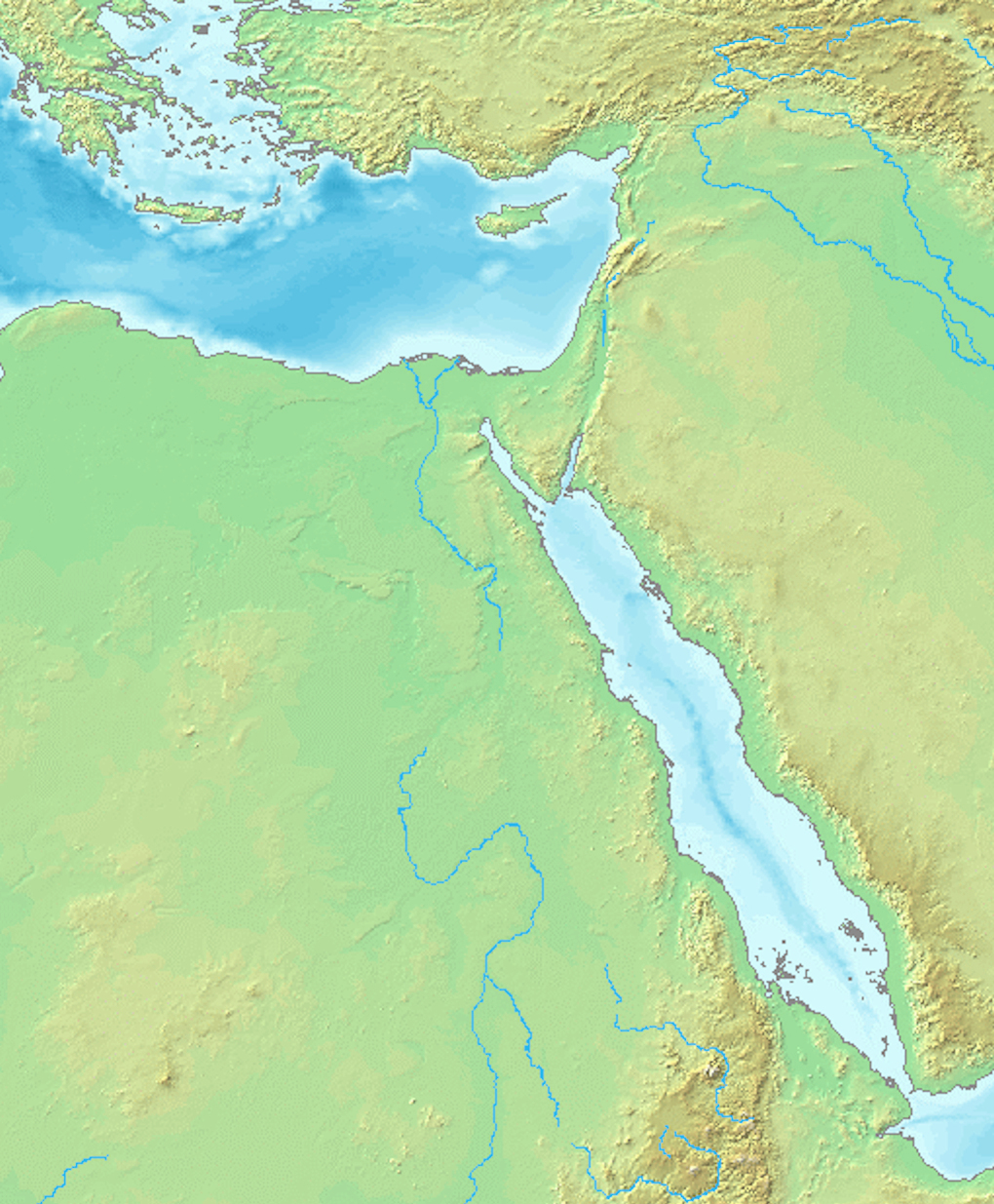
- Location within Northeast Africa Location within Sudan Location within Africa
- 18°32′7″N 31°49′50″E
- Type: Sanctuary
- Location: Karima, Northern State, Sudan
- Region: Nubia
- Part of: Jebel Barkal

History
- Built: 13th century BC
- Built by: Probably Thutmose III

UNESCO World Heritage Site
- Official name: Gebel Barkal and the Sites of the Napatan Region
- Type: Cultural
- Criteria: i, ii, iii, iv, vi
- Designated: 2003 (27th session)
- Reference no.: 1073
- Region: Arab States

The Temple of Amun is an archaeological site at Jebel Barkal in Northern State, Sudan. It is situated about 400 kilometres (250 mi) north of Khartoum near Karima. The temple stands near a large bend of the Nile River, in the region that was called Nubia in ancient times. The Temple of Amun, one of the largest temples at Jebel Barkal, is considered sacred to the local population. Not only was the Amun temple a main centre of what at one time was considered to be an almost universal religion, but, along with the other archaeological sites at Jebel Barkal, it was representative of the revival of Egyptian religious values. Up to the middle of the 19th century, the temple was subjected to vandalism, destruction, and indiscriminate plundering, before it came under state protection.

== History ==
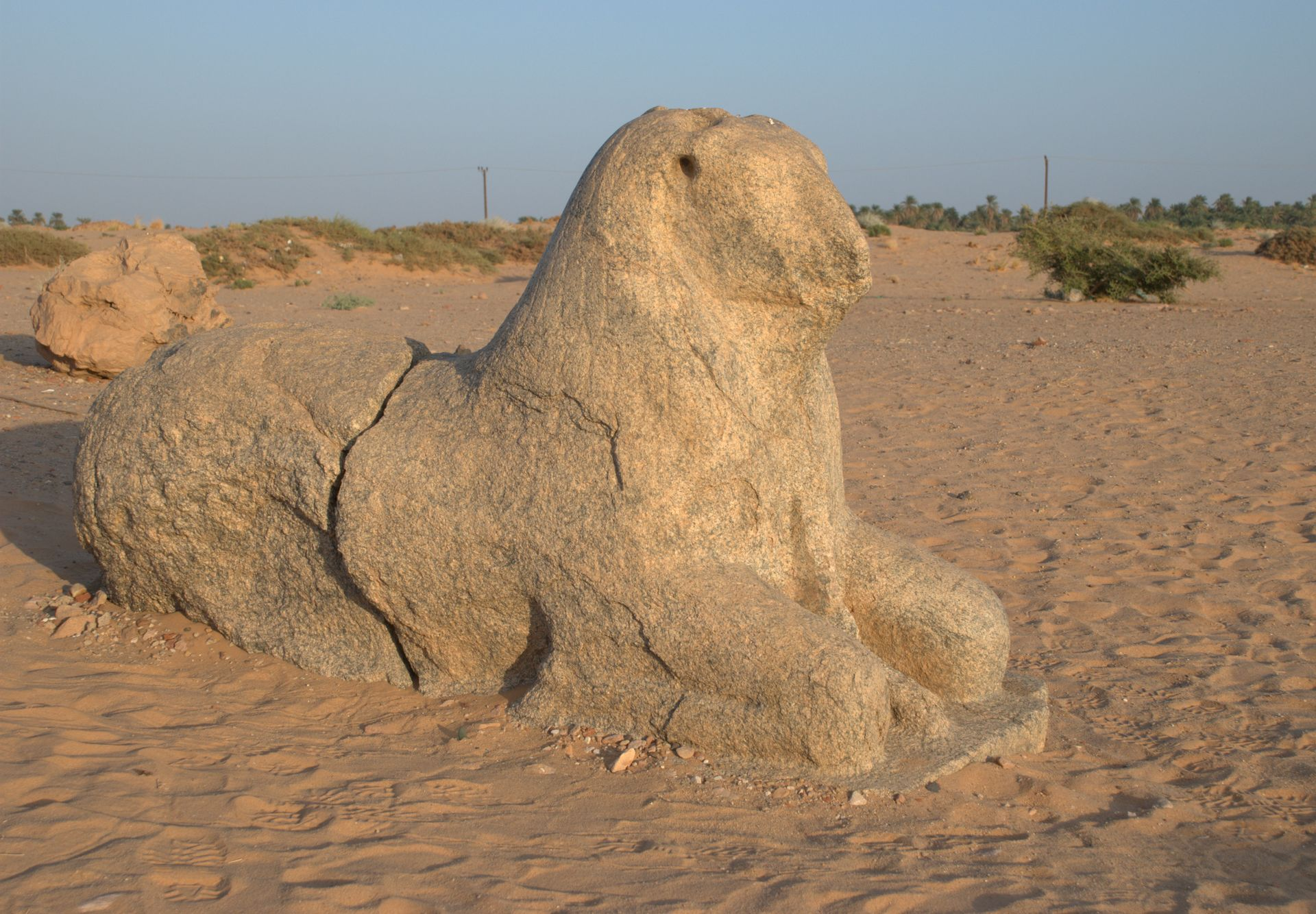
Ram sculpture at Barkal's Amun Temple.

After a military campaign into Nubia, Thutmose III founded the fortified city of Napata as the southern limit of Egypt. It was probably established on or near a prior settlement. Napata had religious significance because of its proximity to Jebel Barkal, believed to be a residence of the god Amun. His other major religious site, the Precinct of Amun-Re, took six weeks to reach by boat from the Napata area.

Construction of the temple occurred in the 13th century BC. The temple's foundation probably occurred during the reign of Thutmose III, while the temple was shaped during his reign and that of Ramses II. Especially at the time of the Napatan empire, the temple was of great importance for the Kushite kingdom. The Nubian king Piye and subsequent Nubian pharaohs expanded Barkal's Amun temple complex, creating a southern rival to the northern Amun temple at Thebes. Although early Meroe rulers had their own capital, government officials took a coronation journey to the Amun Temple of Jebel Barkal. Here, the king went into the Holy of Holies, where he was confirmed as king by a divine oracle. In the years 25/24 BC, the Romans invaded Nubia during a campaign against the Kushites led by Gaius Petronius. He destroyed the temple and took Jebel Barkal from queen Amanirenas, one of the ruling Kandakes. However, the Romans were unable to make permanent gains and withdrew after razing Napata to the ground. The last large-scale construction works were by the Kushite king Natakamani, who restored some of the Roman destruction, enlarged the temple complex, and renovated the first pylon and other parts of the temple.

== Architecture and fittings ==
The first Amun temple at this location, built under the rule of Thutmose III, was a mud brick structure. The earliest mention of this temple is in Thutmose III Jebel Barkal Stele, referring to it as, "[Amun's] Resting place of Eternity." Thutmose's stele presents him as a ruler approved of by Amun. It tells the story of a battle at which Amun is said to have sent a "star" to aid Thutmose, which has been variously interpreted by modern scholars as an omen or divine intervention.

This earliest temple was then dismantled to make room for the new stone temple to be built. The use of brick-like stone blocks called talatat, help date this expansion to Amenhotep IV as he invented the bricks and was mainly used during his reign. The construction can be divided into two phases, with the first having an antechamber, open forecourt with ten faceted columns, and the first pylon, a large gate or entrance to a temple, being built. With no remains being found under the foundation of the first part of the temple, it is thought to be built on virgin ground. In the second phase, there is a clear difference in the construction style, as this came with Amenhotep IV changing his name to "Akhenaten". With his name change came a religious shift as he tried to remove the cult of Amun and replace it with the sun god, Aten. This new god was meant to be worshiped in open-air sanctuaries, and phase two of the temple's construction showcases the new worshiping style with the open air sanctuaires, offering places, and roofless chapels.

After the death of Akhenaten, the temple was once again redone, this time under the rule of Tutankhamun and Horemheb. Increasing the length of the original temple, the old pylon was replaced with a white sandstone talatat block pylon with an additional open court. Another notable improvement to the temple was the green glazed titles that were added to the roof and floor under the portico in front of the pylon. These tiles highlight the importance this temple had and how important the cult of Amun was.

During the Nineteenth Dynasty reign of Pharaoh Ramesses II, the structure included the Second and Third Pylons, a hypostyle court, a hall with annexes, a chapel, and a pronaos and naos complex. Additions included a second temple behind a pylon, another courtyard, probably without pillars, and several chapels. Ramesses II father, Seti I, is believed to have started these additions to the temple, and was also responsible for the 10 columns that replaced the porticos.

A notable temple renovation and enlargement, attributed to Piye, occurred in three stages. First, the old temple was strengthened by a wall and another small portico. For the second step, a large hall with 50 columns, was built. Only the pillars, foundation walls, and entrances were made of sandstone, the remaining walls were of unbaked bricks. Lastly, Piye built a large farm, which was also decorated with columns. The court and the portico each had its own pylon. The whole temple complex became over 150 metres (490 ft) long. The expansion of the temple was to show the success of his conquest of Egypt around 740 BCE. North of the First Pylon, a cache of statues was excavated, which included the headless statue of Tantamani (known also by his Amon name, "Tenutamon"), Taharqa's successor.

Many rulers built additional stele, decorated walls or put up statues in the temple. As the religious center was important to both Egyptians and Nubians, Thutmose III stele contains the inscription, "Home of Amun and the Throne of the Two Lands"; found at the Amun temple, it is now at the Museum of Fine Arts, Boston. There are stelae attributed to Horemheb and Seti I. Taharqa built ten colossal figures. Tantamani erected a small shrine in the portico. In the first courtyard, there are pillars attributed to Piye and Harsiotef.

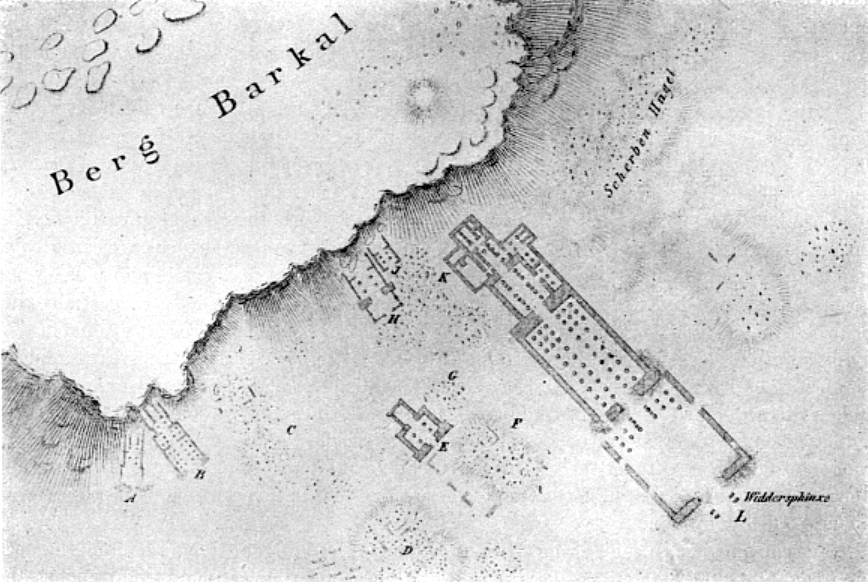
Map from the 1916 Harvard-Boston Museum Expedition at Jabel Barkal

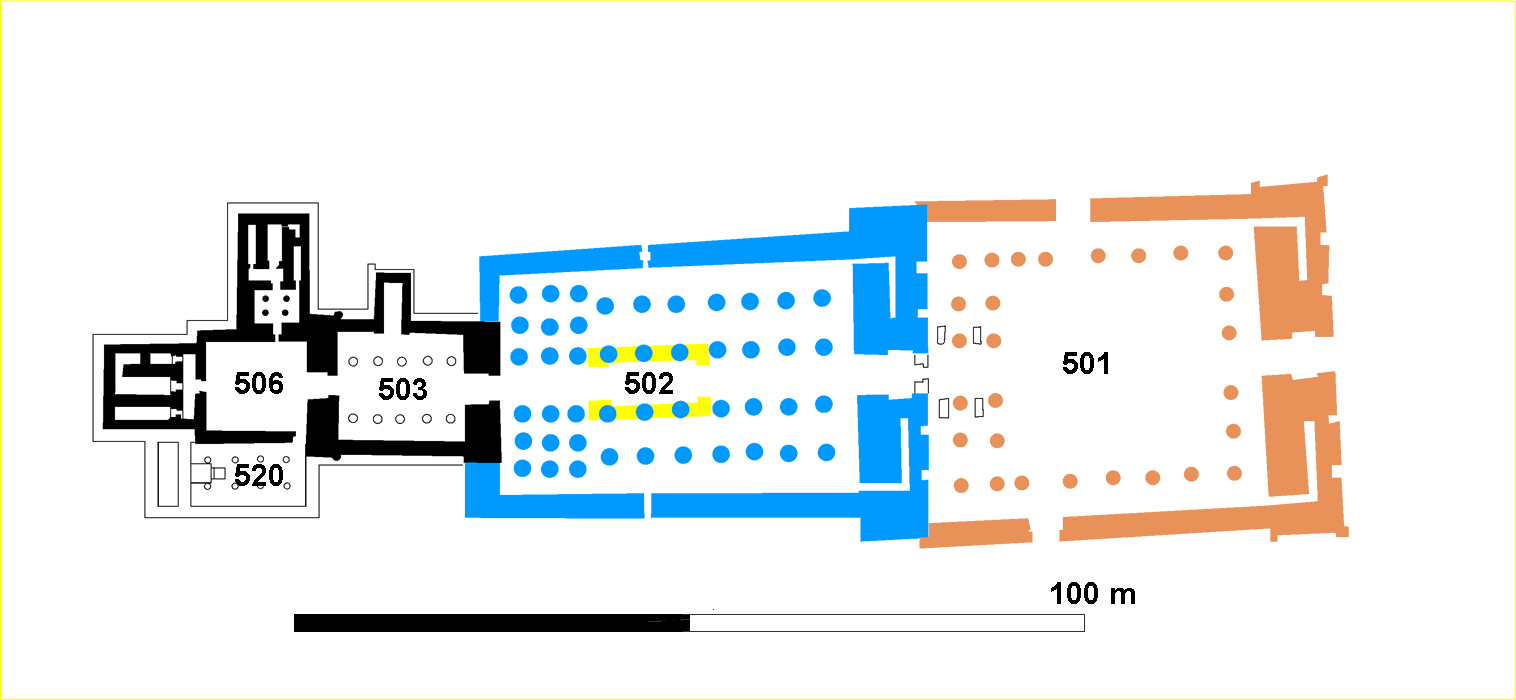
Ground plan of the Temple of Amun.

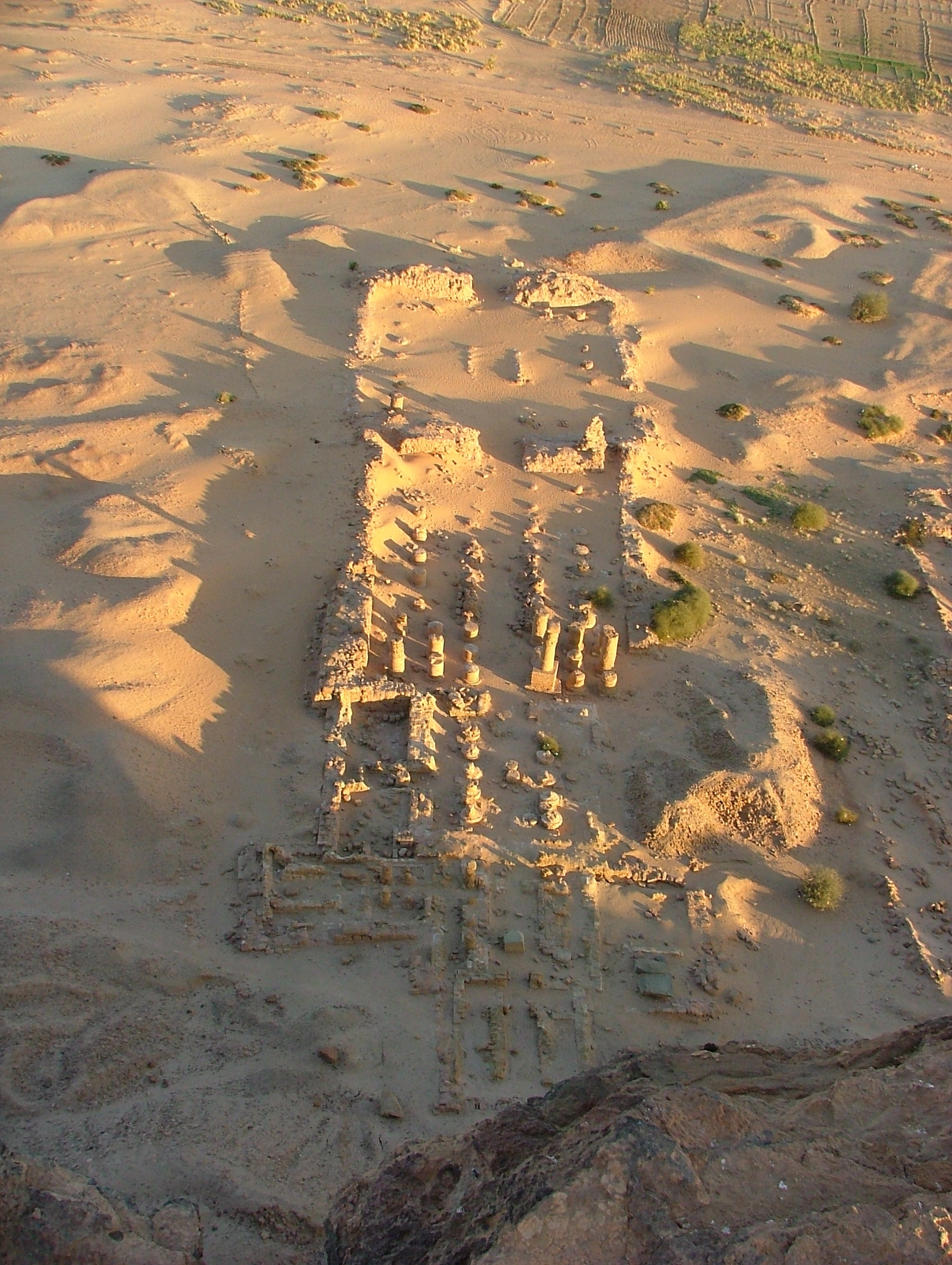
Ruins of the Temple of Amun at Jebel Barkal.

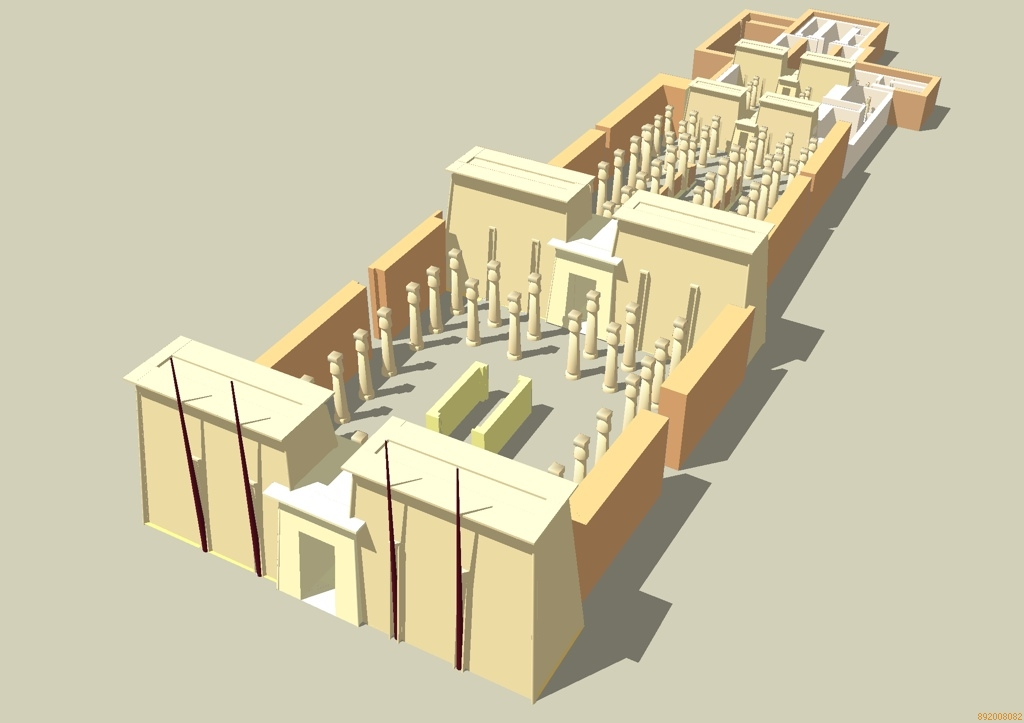
Amun temple of Jebel Barkal, originally built during the Egyptian New Kingdom but greatly enhanced by Piye

== Artifacts in museums ==
Many major artifacts were excavated in 1916 by the Harvard University–Boston Museum of Fine Arts expedition to Egypt and the Sudan, which lasted from 1909 to 1916. Following the excavations, they were assigned to the Museum of Fine Arts in the division of finds by the colonial British-Egyptian government of Sudan.

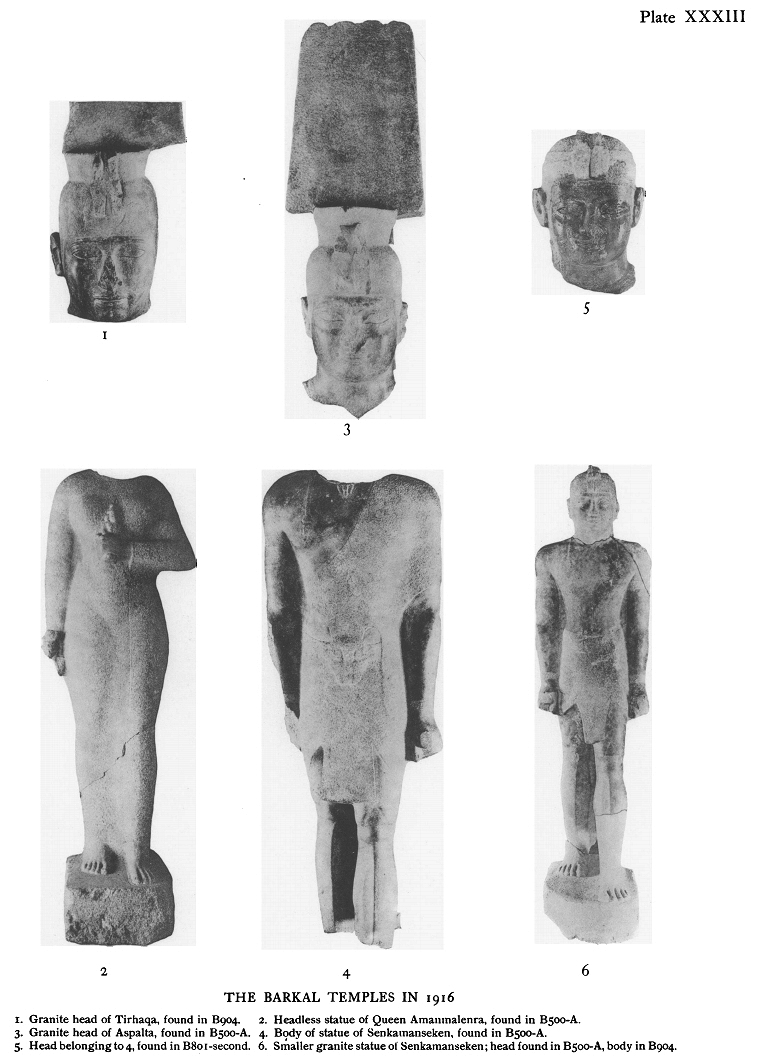
Barkal statues excavated in 1916

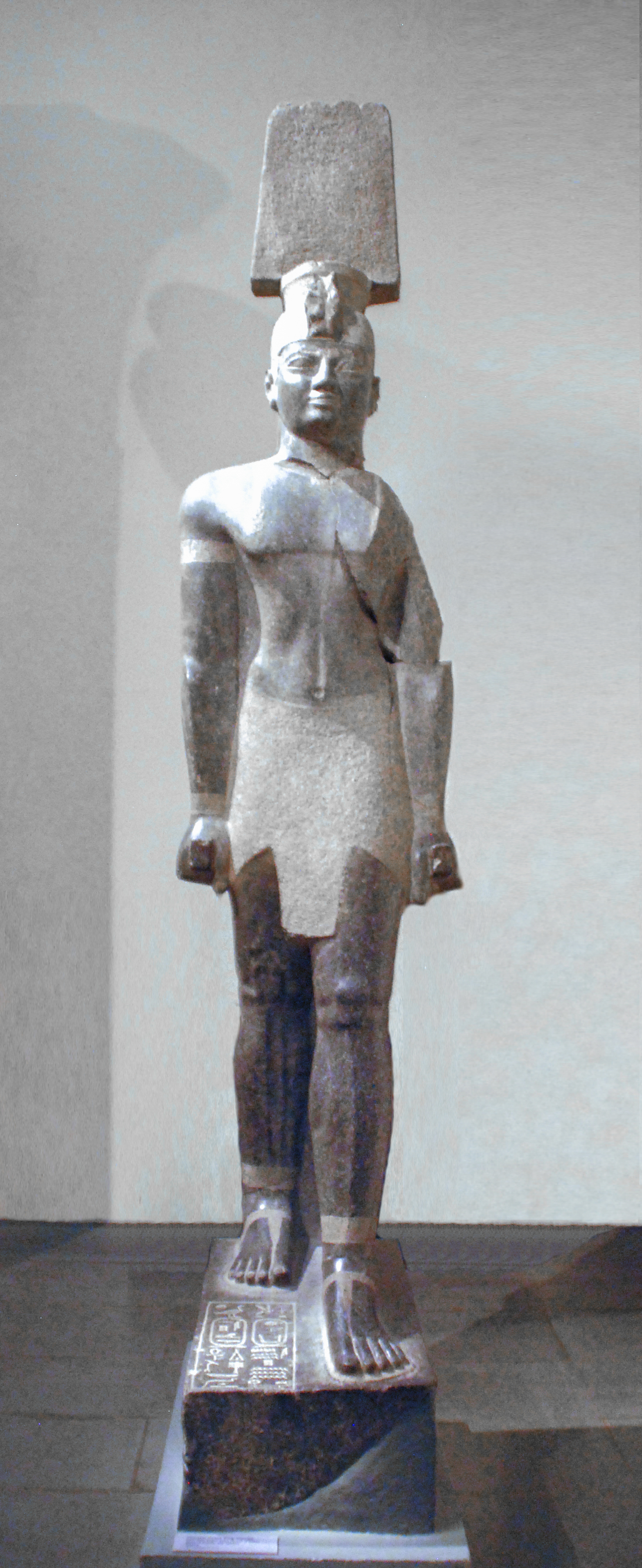
Colossal statue of King Aspelta from the Temple of Amun, Jebel Barkal. Boston Museum of Fine Arts.

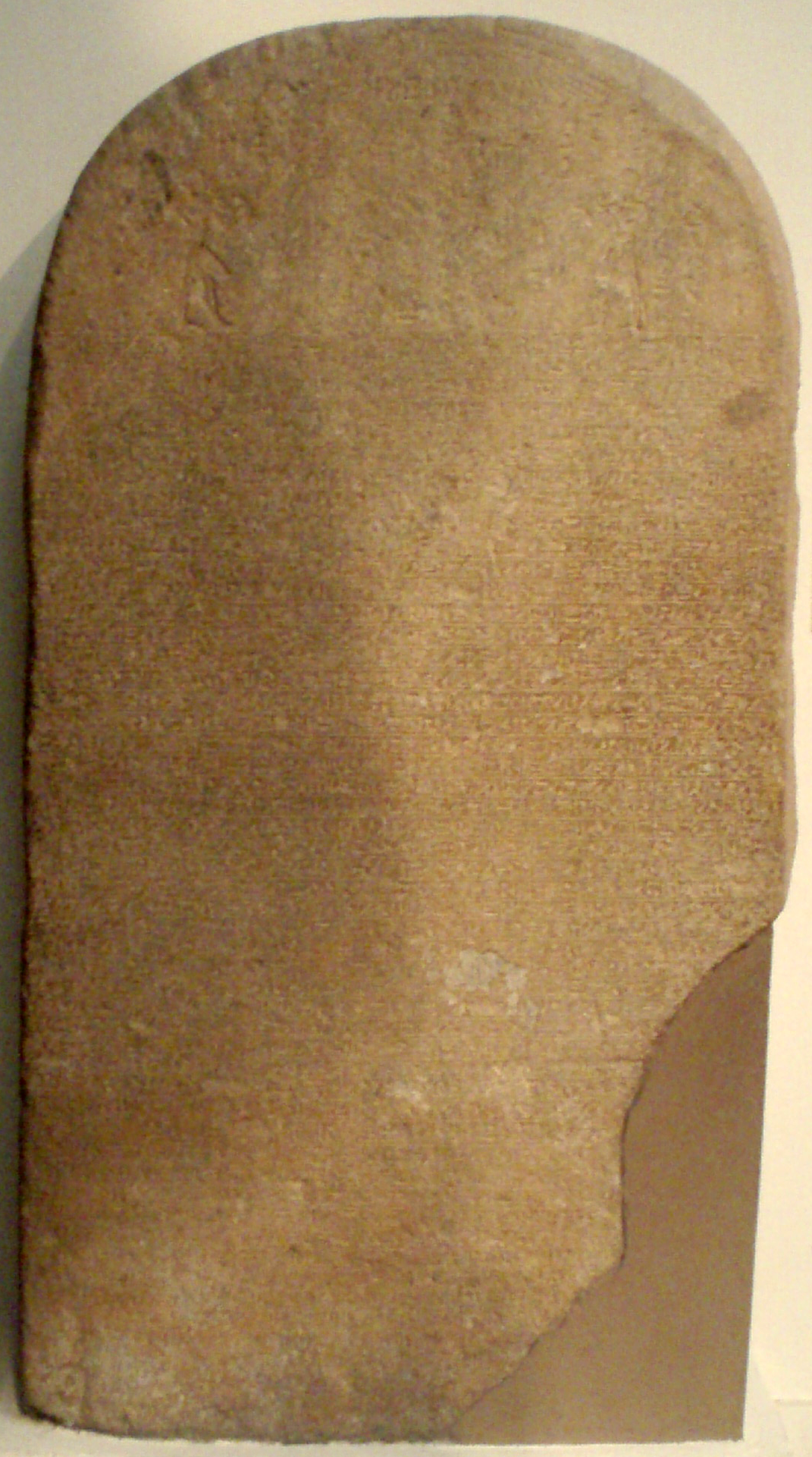
Stela of pharaoh Thutmose III, found at Amun Temple at Barkal, now at the Museum of Fine Arts, Boston.

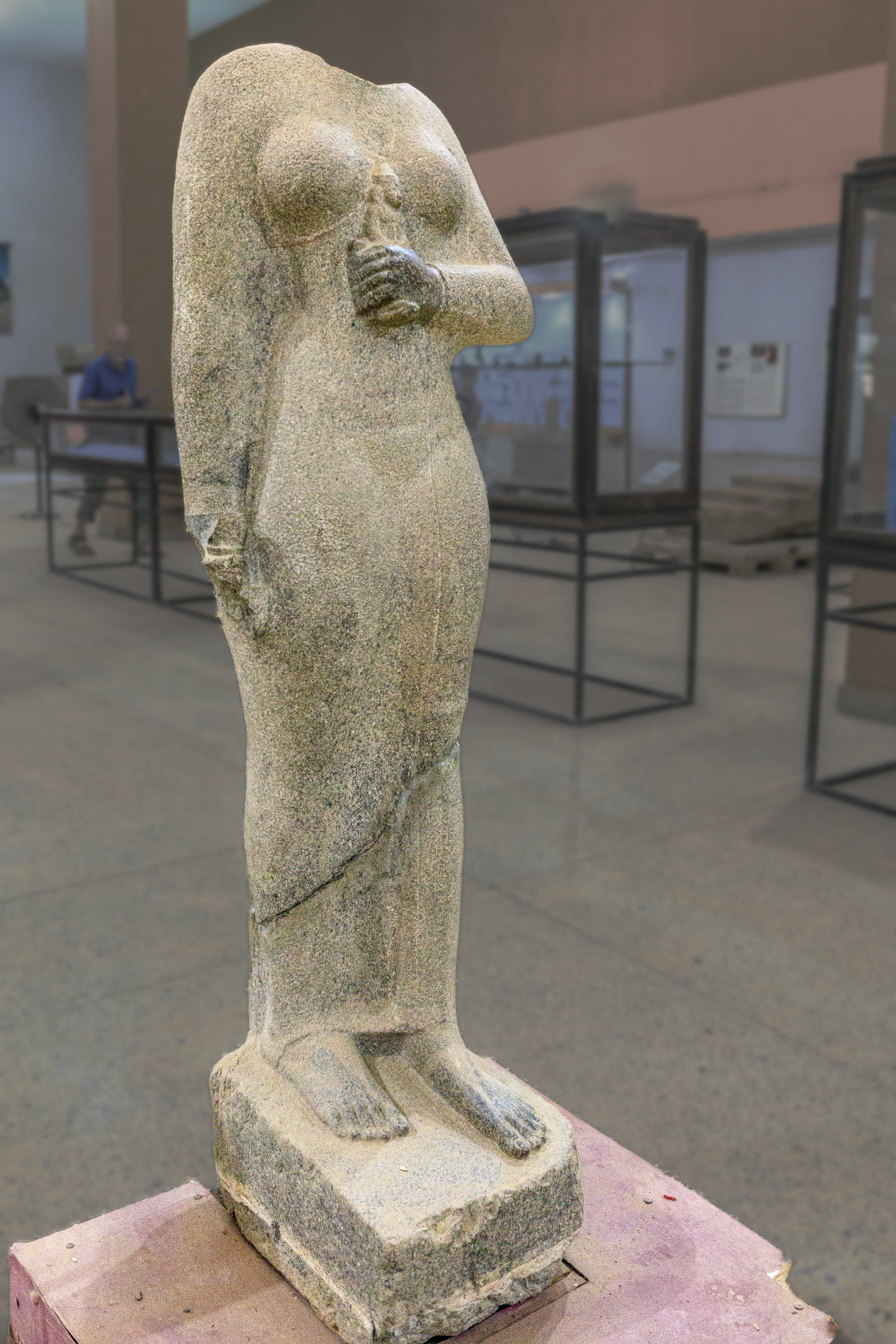
Queen Amanimalil, discovered in 1916

== Sources ==
- Kendall, Timothy. A Visitor's Guide to The Jebel Barkal Temples (PDF). Archived from the original (PDF) on 2020-11-26.
