= Peftjauawybast =

Egyptian ruler

- Peftjaubast
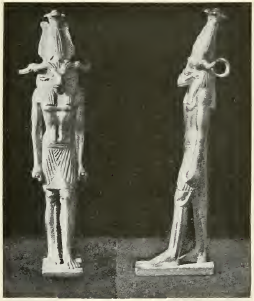
- Golden statuette of Heryshaf with the name of Peftjauawybast, from Herakleopolis.

King of Herakleopolis Magna
- Reign: c. 754 - c. 720 BCE
- Predecessor: Takelot III (as ruler of Herakleopolis)
- Successor: Pediese (not directly)
Royal titulary
Prenomen
Neferkare
Nfr-k3-Rˁ
Perfect is the ka of Ra

M23 X1 L2 X1	N5 nfr kA
Nomen
Peftjauawybast
His breath (of life) is in the hands of Bastet

G39 N5	p f TAw a a W2
- Consorts: Irbastudjanefu, Tasheritenese
- Children: daughters Sopdetemhaawt and Iruatj

Peftjauawybast or Peftjaubast was an ancient Egyptian ruler ("king") of Herakleopolis Magna during the 25th Dynasty.

== Biography ==
He was likely installed as governor of the town during the coregency of pharaoh Osorkon III and his son Takelot III, in 754 BCE. Some time after the death of Osorkon III, Peftjauawybast proclaimed himself king, adopting a royal titulary and starting to date monuments since his "coronation", which should have occurred in around 749 BCE. It is possible that Takelot III permitted this behavior in exchange of his nominal loyalty. Peftjauawybast also married the princess Irbastudjanefu, a daughter of Rudamun, himself brother and successor of Takelot III, thus binding himself to the 23rd Dynasty. By Irbastudjanefu he had a daughter Sopdetemhaawt.

For this ruler two donation steles are known, both dated to his Year 10 (the highest ruling year known for him, although his presence on the Victory stele of Piye allows researchers to further expand his reign length), around 740 BCE. The steles mention another wife, queen Tasheritenese, and a daughter, Iruatj, who was a Singer in the Interior of (the Domain of) Amun. Peftjauawybast is also attested on a golden statuette of the god Heryshaf, found in Herakleopolis, and also depicted on a bronze kneeling statuette now in the Boston Museum of Fine Arts (inv.no. 1977.16).

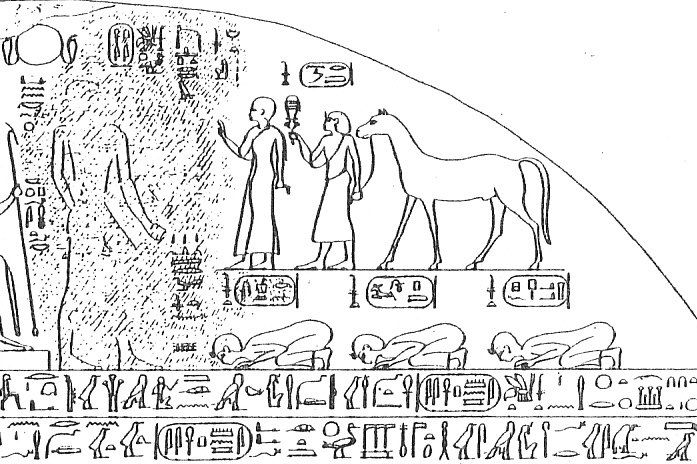
Detail of the Stele of Piye: Peftjauawybast is the far right kneeling king.

At the time of Piye's campaign of conquest (729 BCE), Middle and Lower Egypt were contended by two factions: Piye and his allies/vassals, and the coalition led by prince Tefnakht, the future founder of the 24th Dynasty. Since Peftjauawybast was faithful to the Kushite king, Tefnakht's troops besieged Herakleopolis. Piye, however, was already marching to Lower Egypt and after capturing Hermopolis he came to help his vassal, who joyfully welcomed him.

Peftjauawybast appears on Piye's 'Victory stele' unearthed at Jebel Barkal, where he is depicted as one of the four "kings" submitted by the Kushite conqueror; the other were Osorkon IV of Tanis, Iuput II of Leontopolis and Nimlot of Hermopolis.

His succession is obscure, since we have no records until the installation of Pediese as governor of Herakleopolis in the early 26th Dynasty, several decades later.
