= Henutirdis =

4th-century BC Nubian royal lady

Henutirdis was a Nubian royal lady with the title king's wife, although the reading of the title is uncertain. Her husband was perhaps Harsiotef. So far she is only known from her burial at Nuri (Nu. 34). It is remarkable that she bears an Egyptian name. Most other royal Nubian royal women bear Nubian names.

Her burial at Nuri consists of a pyramid with a chapel and two underground burial chambers. There was a staircase going underground and leading to the burial chambers that were found heavily looted. Fragments of 6 uninscribed shabtis were found. The name of Henutirdis is preserved on an offering table.
