= Nimlot of Hermopolis =

Ancient Egyptian pharaoh

Nimlot
- Nimlot D, Namilt, Nimlot (III)
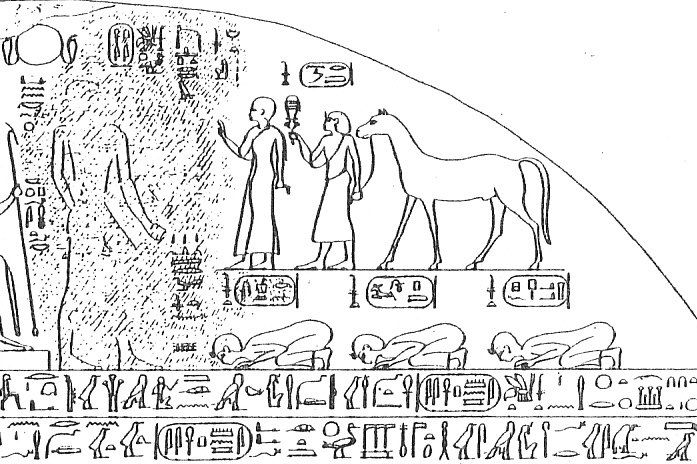
- Detail of the Victory Stele of Piye: Nimlot tributes Piye (left, erased) with a horse and a sistrum.

King of Hermopolis
- Reign: c. 29 years, 754 - 725 BCE
- Successor: Djehutyemhat
Royal titulary
Nomen
Nimlot
N3mjlt

G39 N5	n mA r V13
- Consort: Nestanetmeh
- Father: Osorkon III?

Nimlot was an ancient Egyptian ruler ("king") of Hermopolis during the 25th Dynasty.

== Biography ==
It is possible that Nimlot was a son of king Osorkon III of the 23rd Dynasty, and is likely that he was installed as a governor of Hermopolis by this king, around 754 BCE. He was married to a "queen", Nestanetmeh, and proclaimed himself King around 749 BCE.

At the time of Nimlot's rule, the Kushite king and pharaoh Piye was launching a campaign of conquest against Middle and Lower Egypt (c. 729–728 BCE). At first, Nimlot was an ally/vassal of Piye, but later he pulled back and joined the coalition led by Tefnakht. This volte-face caused Piye's immediate reaction: he marched northward and besieged Hermopolis until Nimlot's capitulation. After the conquest of the city, Nimlot had to give rich tributes to Piye as a compensation for his defection, including a horse and a precious sistrum; Piye, a great lover of horses, was also extremely disappointed to find Nimlot's stables in poor state, and harshly scolded him for the neglect.

After Nimlot's submission, the situation turned more favorable for Piye, and he managed to defeat Tefnakht's coalition. On Piye's Victory stele, Nimlot is one of the four Delta kings subdued by the Nubian conqueror – the others are Iuput II of Leontopolis, Osorkon IV of Tanis and Peftjauawybast of Herakleopolis; among the quartet, Nimlot is depicted standing instead of kneeling, since Piye chose him as interlocutor, while the others were considered "impure", due to the fact that they ate fishes. Nimlot's charges were reconfirmed by Piye before the latter's return in the South.

Later, around 725 BCE, Nimlot was succeeded by Djehutyemhat.

Nimlot should not be confused with his later successor called Nimlot E (or Lamintu in Akkadian) who was ruling the city of Hermopolis when the Assyrians led by Ashurbanipal invaded Egypt in 667/666 BCE.

== Bibliography ==
- T.G.H. James, Egypt: the XXV and XXVI Dynasties, in The Cambridge Ancient History, vol 3, part 2, 1991 (2006), Cambridge University Press, ISBN 0 521 22717 8.
- Kenneth Kitchen, The Third Intermediate Period in Egypt (1100–650 BC), 1996, Aris & Phillips Limited, Warminster, ISBN 0-85668-298-5.
