= Stele of Piye =

Egyptian archaeological artifact

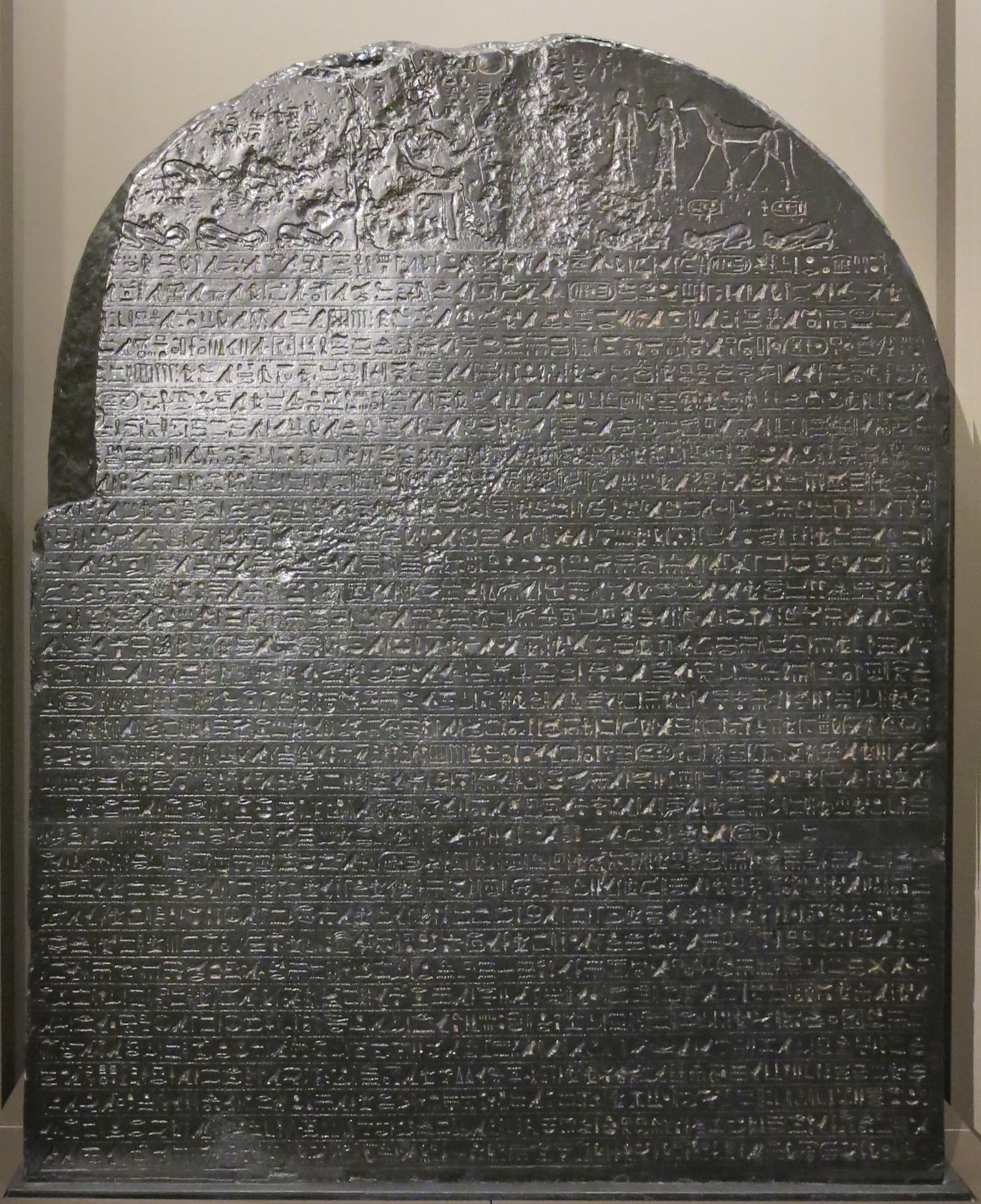
- Stele of Piye (Louvre Museum reconstruction)
- Material: Granite
- Discovered: 1862; Jebel Barkal
- Present location: Egyptian Museum, Cairo
- Identification: JE 48862

The Stele of Piye, also known as the Victory Stele of Piye, is an Ancient Nubian stele detailing the victory of Kushite King Piye against Prince Tefnakht of Sais and his allies. It was discovered in Jebel Barkal and is currently part of the collection of the Egyptian Museum in Cairo, Egypt.

Following its discovery, the Stele of Piye was published by Auguste Mariette in 1872. It consists of a front, a reverse, and two thick sides, all covered with text. Emmanuel de Rougé published a complete word-by-word translation in French in 1876.

The stele inscription describes Piye as very religious, compassionate, and a lover of horses.

== Victory Stele of Piye ==
The Victory Stele of Piye dates to Egypt's Twenty-fifth Dynasty (circa 747–656 BCE). It was commissioned during the twenty-first year of Piye’s reign (circa 747–716 BCE) to justify his rulership over all of Egypt. The stela portrays Piye, a Nubian, as a legitimate Egyptian ruler and superior to his Libyan opponent in the Nile Delta. Nubia, located along the Nile River south of Egypt, spanned from modern-day Aswan to Meroë, Sudan, with its capital at Napata during Piye's reign. The stela, made of dark-gray granite, was discovered in the temple of the god Amun at Jebel Barkal in 1862. It measures approximately six feet in height, four feet seven inches in width, and one foot five inches in thickness, weighing around two and a quarter tons.

== Historical Context ==
During Egypt's Third Intermediate Period, the country experienced frequent invasions and internal turmoil following the Twentieth Dynasty's end (circa 1190–1069 BCE). The Twenty-fifth Dynasty began in the eighth century BCE under Nubian control, as the Nubians, led by Piye's predecessors, Alara or Kashta, expanded into Egypt. Piye succeeded Kashta around 747 BCE, embarking on campaigns to assert dominance over Egypt, which included establishing his sister, Amenirdis I, as “God’s Wife of Amun” in Thebes. Piye invaded Egypt again in his twentieth regnal year, resulting in the defeat of Tefnakhte, ruler of Sais, and erected his Victory Stela in his twenty-first year.

At some point after Piye's death, his name and figure was erased from the stele in an act of Damnatio memoriae, though his name can still be reconstructed.

== Description ==
The stela text is written in classical Middle Egyptian and intended to showcase Piye’s supremacy and divine favor.

=== Opening Speech ===
The stela opens with the date of “Regnal year 21, first month of Inundation.” and Piye declares his superiority over his ancestors and states his divine right to rule as the son of Ra, representation of Atum, and beloved of Amun.

=== Piye in Nubia ===
The political scene of the land at the time was governed in provinces, referred to as nomes in the stela, and so it was very decentralized. Understanding this, when Tefnakhte takes power, he expands southward, to spread further his influence. Soon after, Piye receives news of Tefnakhte’s advances as well as the pleas for help from local rulers under Tefnakhte’s control. This prompts Piye to send his commanders to Egypt with strict instructions on noble conduct in battle, emphasizing the importance of purity and the support of Amun.

=== Campaign in Egypt ===
Piye’s troops fight various battles, including a notable victory at Heracleopolis. The stela lists the rulers of Lower Egypt and their fates after encountering Piye’s forces. After hearing the fleeing of King Namlot, to assumedly spread false tales of conquest, Pinakhi becomes enraged and decides to personally lead his forces into Egypt. This allows him to reaffirm previous oaths and participate in significant religious festivals, named “Night Feast of Opet” and “Abiding in Thebes”.

=== Battle at Hermopolis ===
Pivotal to the campaign are the battles at Hermopolis and Memphis. Piye joins his forces, leads successful sieges, and accepts the surrender of rulers like King Namlot, who enlists his wife’s help to the royal women seeking mercy from Piye. Piye receives a great many treasures and tribute that fills his storehouses. He proceeds to the temple of Thoth, the deity of Hermopolis, and the temple of Ogdoad, where he sacrifices cattle in honor of capturing the cities.

=== Capture of Memphis ===
Piye’s forces capture Memphis after facing strong resistance. Subsequent victories prompt additional rulers to surrender and offer tributes. Piye's dominance consolidates as he receives submissions from significant figures in Lower Egypt.

=== Religious Pilgrimage ===
During his campaign, Piye makes religious offerings and purification rituals at key locations, including Heliopolis, to ensure divine favor and prosperity. His relationship with the deity Amun is a recurring reason for justification of his rulership.

=== Tefnakhte’s Submission ===
Tefnakhte submits to Piye, suggesting a peaceful resolution and his allegiance to Piye. His oath is taken in the presence of Theban religious and military representatives to ensure compliance.

=== Return to Nubia ===
Having achieved victory, Piye returns to Nubia. His loot and captives are transported, and a chant of jubilation praises his eternal victory and beloved status.

== Conclusion ==
The Victory Stela of Piye was a strategic artifact to legitimize Piye's rulership and showcase his accomplishments. By combining religious legitimacy with strategic conquests, Piye was able to assert his authority over Egypt and Nubia. It reflects his firm devotion to the divine in the assertion of power, military prowess, and ability to bridge cultures and regions. His unification emphasized his position as a divinely favored and rightful ruler of Egypt and Nubia.

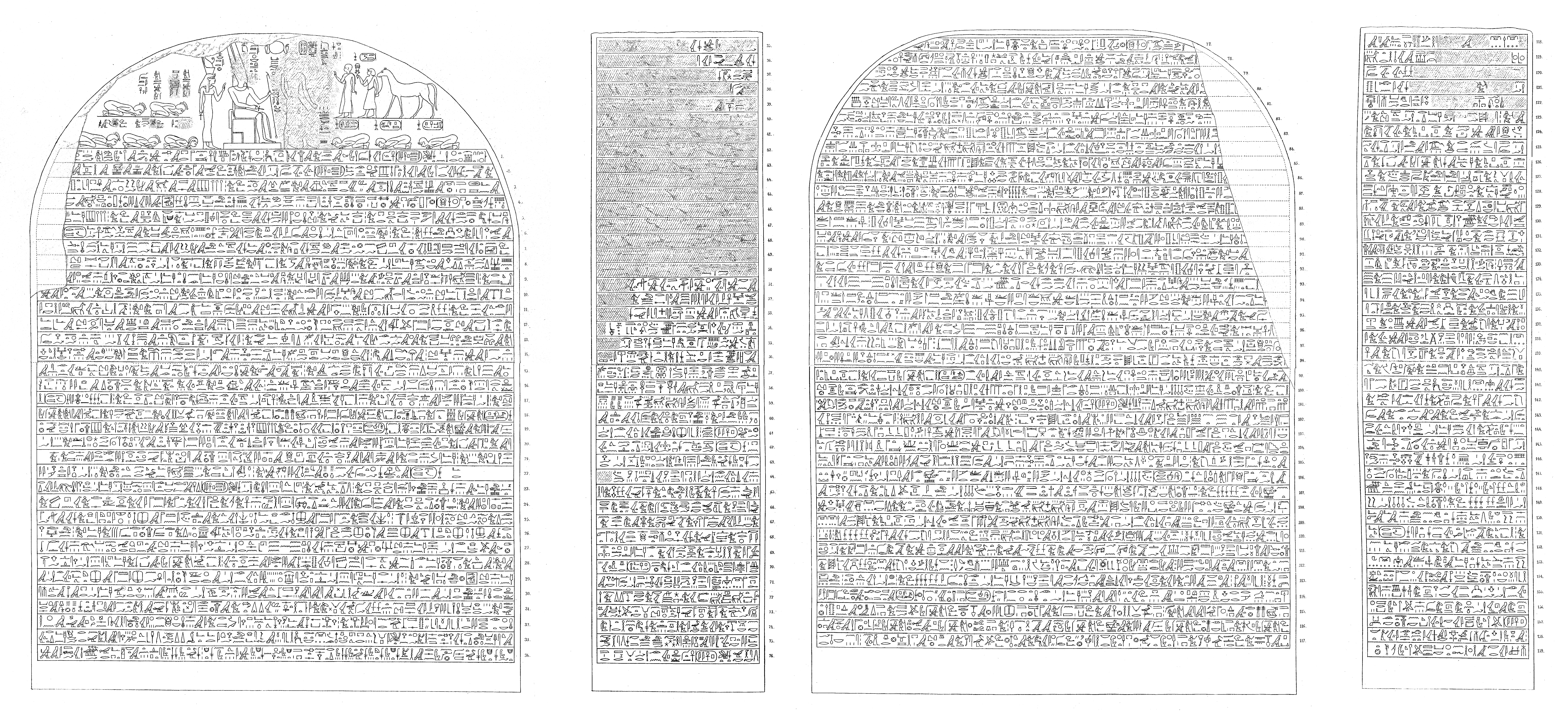
Stele of Piye
(complete transcription).

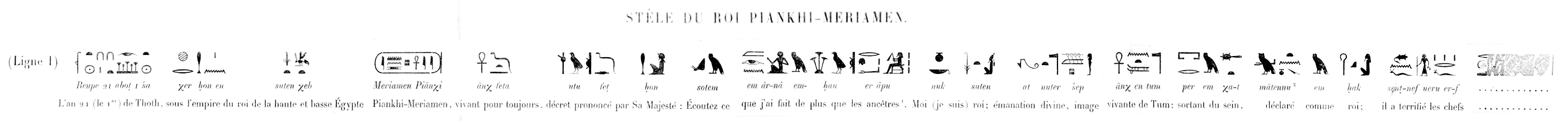
Stele of Piye. Translation of first line (sample).

== See also ==
- Nimlot of Hermopolis
- Peftjauawybast
