= Amun =

Ancient Egyptian god

- After the Amarna period, Amun was painted with blue skin, symbolizing his association with air and primeval creation. Amun was also depicted in a wide variety of other forms.
Name in hieroglyphs
Amun:i mn n C12 Amun-Ra: i mn n ra Z1 C12 Amun-Ra written in a Cartouche:< ra Z1 i mn n A40 >
- Major cult center: Thebes, Hermopolis, (as a member of the Ogdoad)
- Symbol: two vertical plumes, the ram-headed Sphinx (Criosphinx)
- Temple: Siwa Oasis
- Consort: Amunet; Wosret; Mut; Rhea (Libyan)
- Offspring: Khonsu; Harpara; Tjenenyet; Dionysus (Libyan)

Equivalents
- Greek: Zeus
- Roman: Jupiter

Amun (Note: US: /ˈɑːmən/; also Amon, Ammon, Amana, Amen; Ancient Egyptian: jmn, reconstructed as /jaˈmaːnuw/ (Old Egyptian and early Middle Egyptian) → /ʔaˈmaːnəʔ/ (later Middle Egyptian) → /ʔaˈmoːn/ (Late Egyptian), Coptic: Ⲁⲙⲟⲩⲛ, romanized: Amoun; Greek Ἄμμων Ámmōn, Ἅμμων Hámmōn; Phoenician: 𐤀𐤌𐤍, romanized: ʾmn) was a major ancient Egyptian deity who appears as a member of the Hermopolitan Ogdoad. Amun was attested from the Old Kingdom together with his wife Amunet. His oracle in Siwa Oasis, located in Western Egypt near the Libyan Desert, remained the only oracle of Amun throughout. With the 11th Dynasty (c. 21st century BC), Amun rose to the position of patron deity of Thebes by replacing Montu.

Initially possibly one of eight deities in the Hermopolite creation myth, his worship expanded. After the rebellion of Thebes against the Hyksos and with the rule of Ahmose I (16th century BC), Amun acquired national importance, expressed in his fusion with the Sun god, Ra, as Amun-Ra (alternatively spelled Amon-Ra or Amun-Re). On his own, he was also thought to be the king of the gods. The later New kingdom and post New kingdom Ram headed form of Amun was a Nubian Influence.

Amun-Ra retained chief importance in the Egyptian pantheon throughout the New Kingdom (with the exception of the "Atenist heresy" under Akhenaten). Amun-Ra in this period (16th–11th centuries BC) held the position of transcendental, self-created creator deity "par excellence"; he was the champion of the poor or troubled and central to personal piety. With Osiris, Amun-Ra is the most widely recorded of the Egyptian gods.

As the chief deity of the Egyptian Empire, Amun-Ra also came to be worshiped outside Egypt, according to the testimony of ancient Greek historiographers in Libya and Nubia. As Zeus Ammon and Jupiter Ammon, he came to be identified with Zeus in Greece and Jupiter in Rome.

== Early history ==
Amun and Amaunet are mentioned in the Old Egyptian Pyramid Texts. The name Amun (written imn) meant something like "the hidden one" or "invisible", which is also attested by epithets found in the Pyramid Texts "O You, the great god whose name is unknown".

Amun rose to the position of tutelary deity of Thebes after the end of the First Intermediate Period, under the 11th Dynasty. As the patron of Thebes, his spouse was Mut. In Thebes, Amun as father, Mut as mother, and the Moon god Khonsu as their son formed the divine family or the "Theban Triad".

== Temple at Karnak ==
The history of Amun as the patron god of Thebes begins in the 20th century BC, with the construction of the Precinct of Amun-Ra at Karnak under Senusret I. The city of Thebes does not appear to have been of great significance before the 11th Dynasty.

Major construction work in the Precinct of Amun-Ra took place during the 18th Dynasty when Thebes became the capital of the unified ancient Egypt.

Construction of the Hypostyle Hall may have also begun during the 18th Dynasty, though most building was undertaken under Seti I and Ramesses II. Merenptah commemorated his victories over the Sea Peoples on the walls of the Cachette Court, the start of the processional route to the Luxor Temple. This Great Inscription (which has now lost about a third of its content) shows the king's campaigns and eventual return with items of potential value and prisoners. Next to this inscription is the Victory Stela, which is largely a copy of the more famous Merneptah Stele found in the funerary complex of Merenptah on the west bank of the Nile in Thebes. Merenptah's son Seti II added two small obelisks in front of the Second Pylon, and a triple bark-shrine to the north of the processional avenue in the same area. This was constructed of sandstone, with a chapel to Amun flanked by those of Mut and Khonsu.

The last major change to the Precinct of Amun-Ra's layout was the addition of the first pylon and the massive enclosure walls that surrounded the whole Precinct, both constructed by Nectanebo I.

== New Kingdom ==
=== Identification with Min and Ra ===
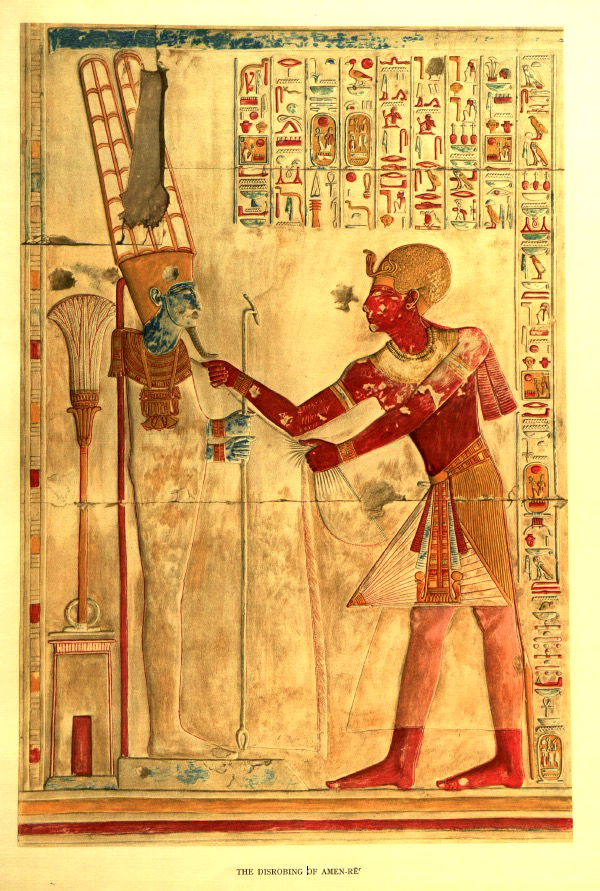
Amun depicted with Seti I in the temple and Chapel at Abydos

When the army of the founder of the Eighteenth Dynasty expelled the Hyksos rulers from Egypt, the victor's city of origin, Thebes, became the most important city in Egypt, the capital of a new dynasty. The local patron deity of Thebes, Amun, therefore became nationally important. The pharaohs of that new dynasty attributed all of their successes to Amun, and they lavished much of their wealth and captured spoil on the construction of temples dedicated to Amun. The victory against the "foreign rulers" achieved by pharaohs who worshipped Amun caused him to be seen as a champion of the less fortunate, upholding the rights of justice for the poor. By aiding those who traveled in his name, he became the Protector of the road. Since he upheld Ma'at (truth, justice, and goodness), those who prayed to Amun were required first to demonstrate that they were worthy, by confessing their sins. Votive stelae from the artisans' village at Deir el-Medina record:

[Amun] who comes at the voice of the poor in distress, who gives breath to him who is wretched ... You are Amun, the Lord of the silent, who comes at the voice of the poor; when I call to you in my distress You come and rescue me ... Though the servant was disposed to do evil, the Lord is disposed to forgive. The Lord of Thebes spends not a whole day in anger; His wrath passes in a moment; none remains. His breath comes back to us in mercy ... May your ka be kind; may you forgive; It shall not happen again.

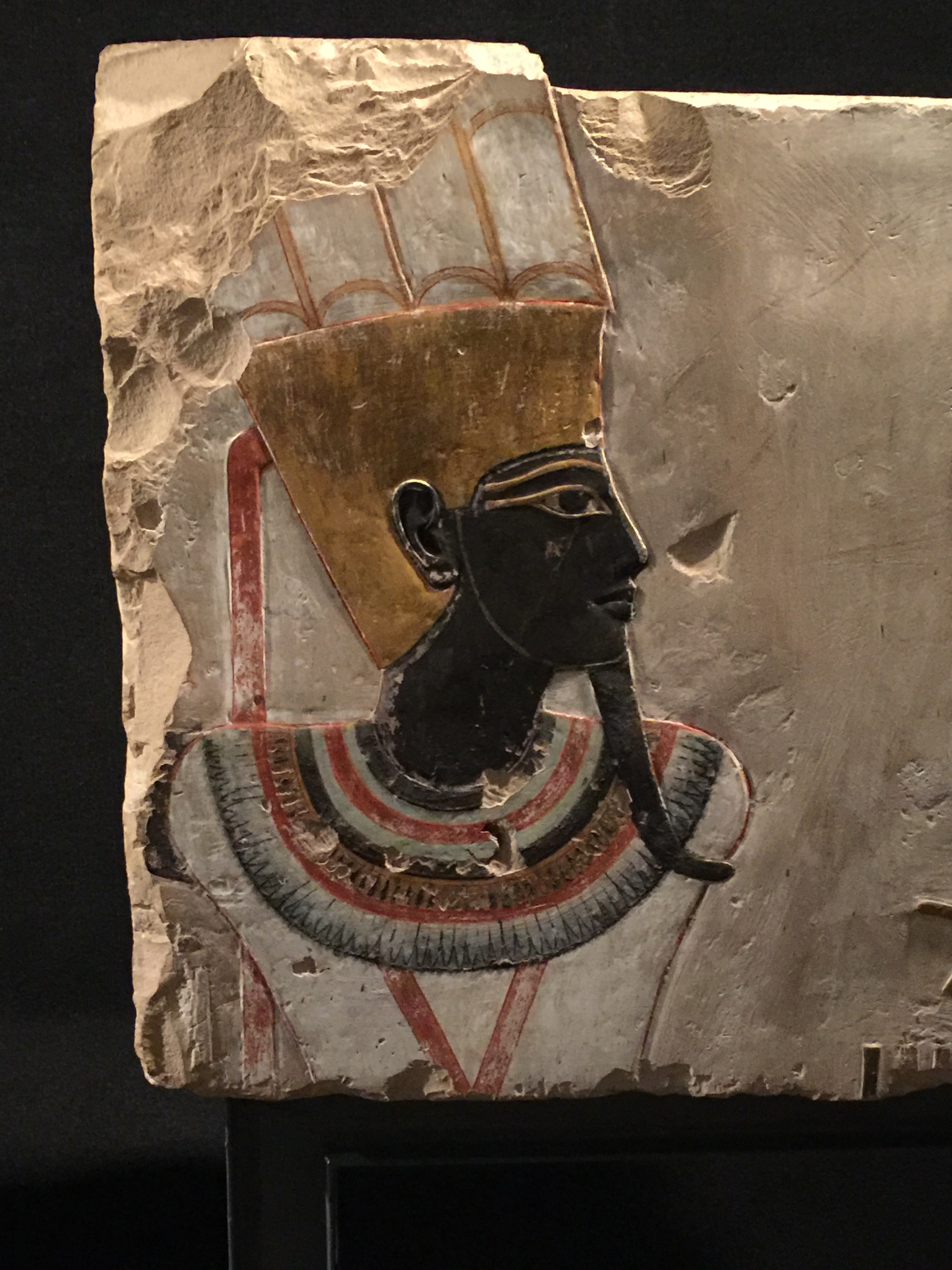
Min in a relief from the reign of Thutmose III from Deir el-Bahari.

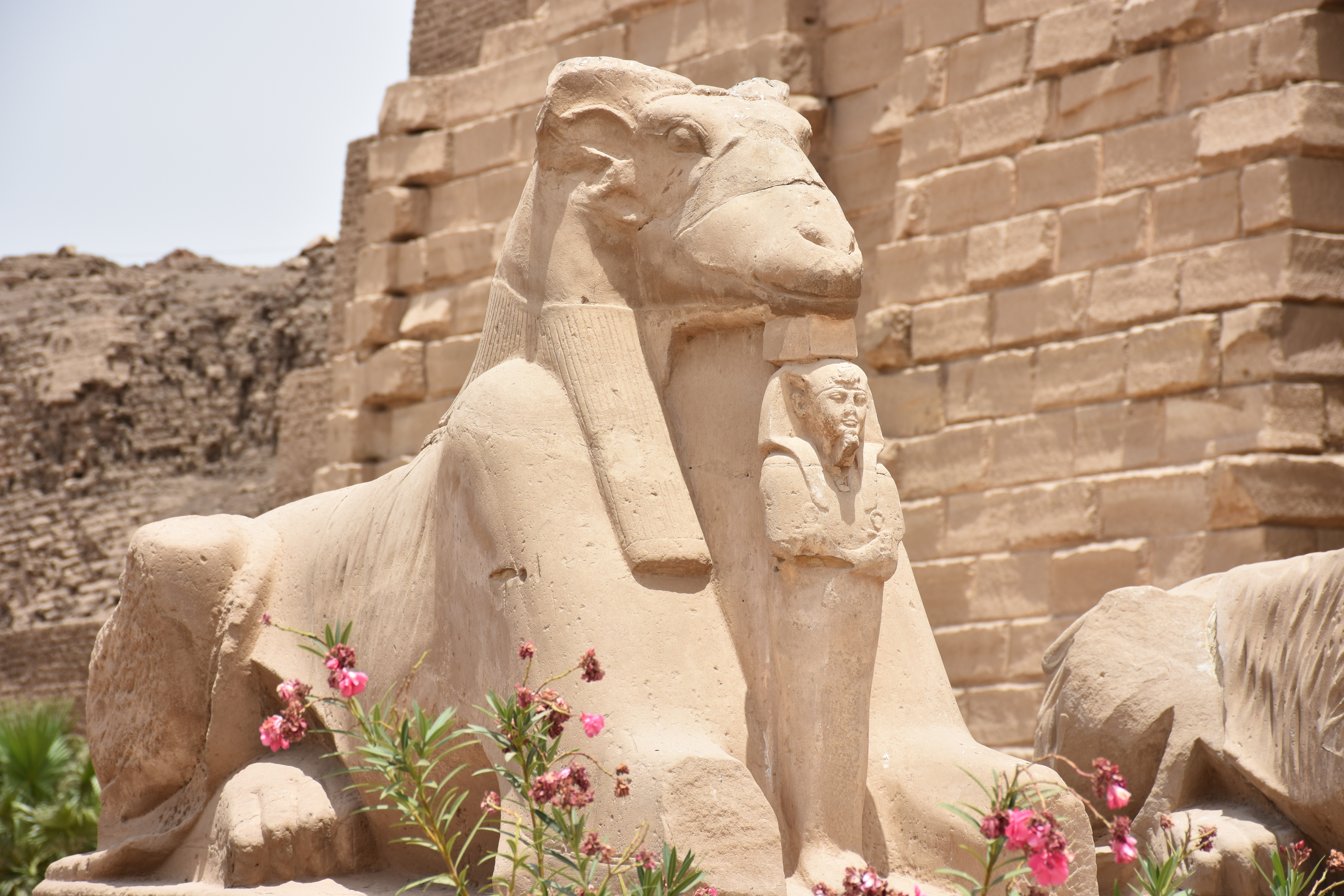
Ka-mut-ef, "Bull of His Mother" as a ram-headed lion in the Avenue of Sphinxes at Karnak Temple

Subsequently, when Egypt conquered Kush, they identified the chief deity of the Kushites as Amun. This Kush deity was depicted as ram-headed, more specifically a woolly ram with curved horns. Amun thus became associated with the ram arising from the aged appearance of the Kush ram deity, and depictions related to Amun sometimes had small ram's horns, known as the Horns of Ammon. A solar deity in the form of a ram can be traced to the pre-literate Kerma culture in Nubia, contemporary to the Old Kingdom of Egypt. The later (Meroitic period) name of Nubian Amun was Amani, attested in numerous personal names such as Tanwetamani, Arkamani, and Amanitore. Since rams were considered a symbol of virility, Amun also became thought of as a fertility deity, and so started to absorb the identity of Min, becoming Amun-Min. This association with virility led to Amun-Min gaining the epithet Kamutef, meaning "Bull of his mother", in which form he was found depicted on the walls of Karnak, ithyphallic, and with a "flail", as Min was.

As the cult of Amun grew in importance, Amun became identified with the chief deity who was worshipped in other areas during that period, namely the sun god Ra. This identification led to another merger of identities, with Amun becoming Amun-Ra. In the Hymn to Amun-Ra he is described as

Lord of truth, father of the gods, maker of men, creator of all animals, Lord of things that are, creator of the staff of life.

Amun (New Kingdom) (Note: Originally, Amun was depicted with red-brown skin during the New Kingdom, with two plumes on his head, the ankh symbol, and the was sceptre. After the Amarna period, Amun was instead painted with blue skin.)

Amun (Post Amarna)

Amun-Ra (New Kingdom)

Amun-Ra (Post Amarna)

Amun as a Ram Headed man (New Kingdom)

Amun as a Ram Headed man (Post Amarna)

Amun-Min

Amun-Ra-Min

=== Amarna Period ===
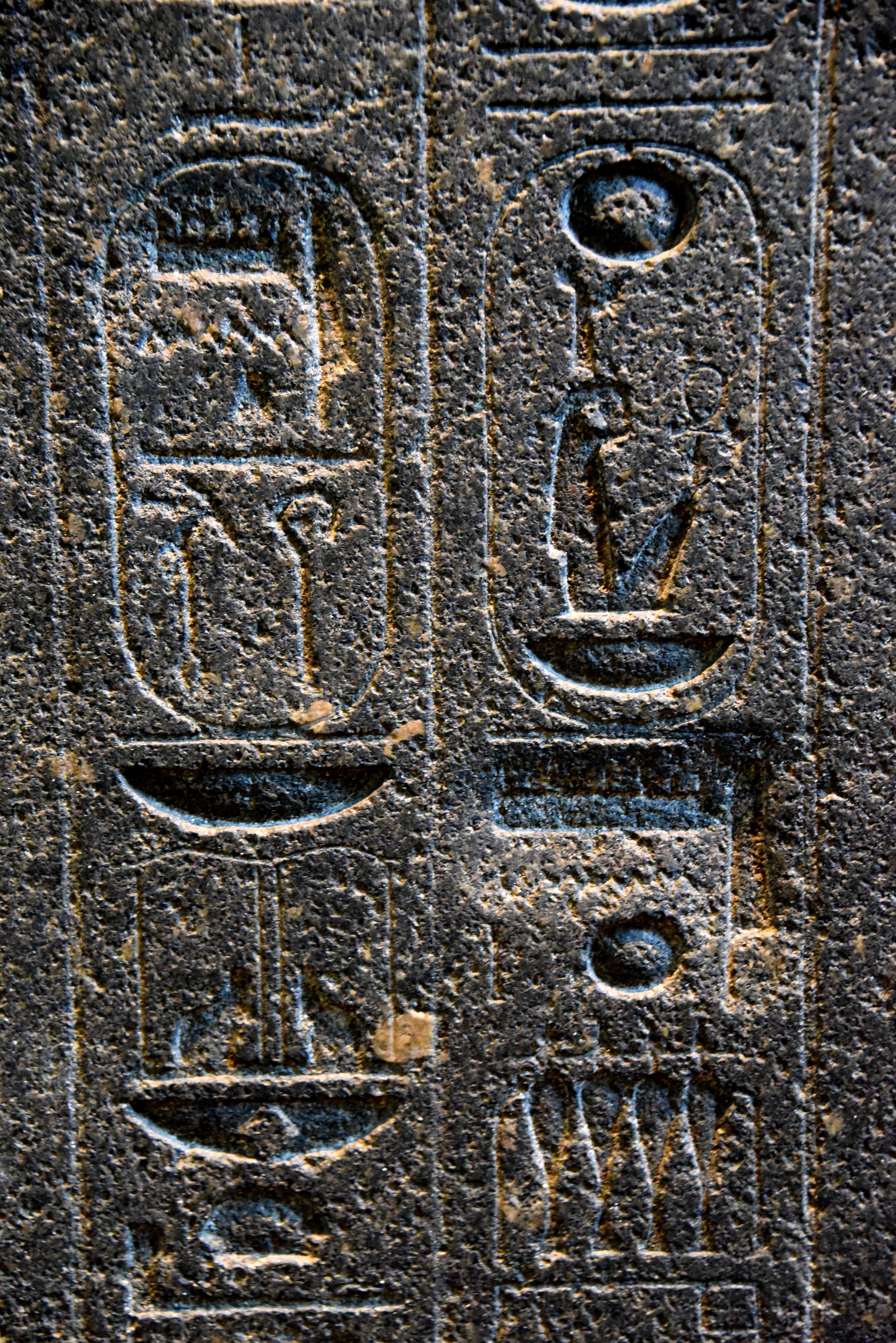
Hieroglyphs on the backpillar of Amenhotep III's statue. There are two places where Akhenaten's agents erased the name Amun, later restored on a deeper surface. The British Museum, London

During the latter part of the Eighteenth dynasty, the pharaoh Akhenaten (also known as Amenhotep IV) advanced the worship of the Aten, a deity whose power was manifested in the sun disk, both literally and symbolically. He defaced the symbols of many of the old deities, and based his religious practices upon the deity, the Aten. He moved his capital away from Thebes, but this abrupt change was very unpopular with the priests of Amun, who now found themselves without any of their former power. The religion of Egypt was inexorably tied to the leadership of the country, the pharaoh being the leader of both. The pharaoh was the highest priest in the temple of the capital, and the next lower level of religious leaders were important advisers to the pharaoh, many being administrators of the bureaucracy that ran the country.

The introduction of Atenism under Akhenaten constructed a monolatrist worship of Aten in direct competition with that of Amun. Praises of Amun on stelae are strikingly similar in language to those later used, in particular, the Hymn to the Aten:

When thou crossest the sky, all faces behold thee, but when thou departest, thou are hidden from their faces ... When thou settest in the western mountain, then they sleep in the manner of death ... The fashioner of that which the soil produces, ... a mother of profit to gods and men; a patient craftsman, greatly wearying himself as their maker ... valiant herdsman, driving his cattle, their refuge and the making of their living ... The sole Lord, who reaches the end of the lands every day, as one who sees them that tread thereon ... Every land chatters at his rising every day, in order to praise him.

When Akhenaten died, Akhenaten's successor, Smenkhkare, became pharaoh and Atenism remained established during his brief 2-year reign. When Smenkhkare died, an enigmatic female pharaoh known as Neferneferuaten took the throne for a brief period but it is unclear what happened during her reign. After Neferneferuaten's death, Akhenaten's 9-year-old son Tutankhaten succeeded her. At the beginning of his reign, the young pharaoh reversed Atenism, re-establishing the old polytheistic religion and renaming himself Tutankhamun. His sister-wife, then named Ankhesenpaaten, followed him and was renamed Ankhesenamun. Worship of the Aten ceased for the most part and worship of Amun-Ra was restored.

During the reign of Horemheb, Akhenaten's name was struck from Egyptian records, all of his religious and governmental changes were undone, and the capital was returned to Thebes. The return to the previous capital and its patron deity was accomplished so swiftly that it seemed this monolatrist cult and its governmental reforms had never existed.

=== Theology ===
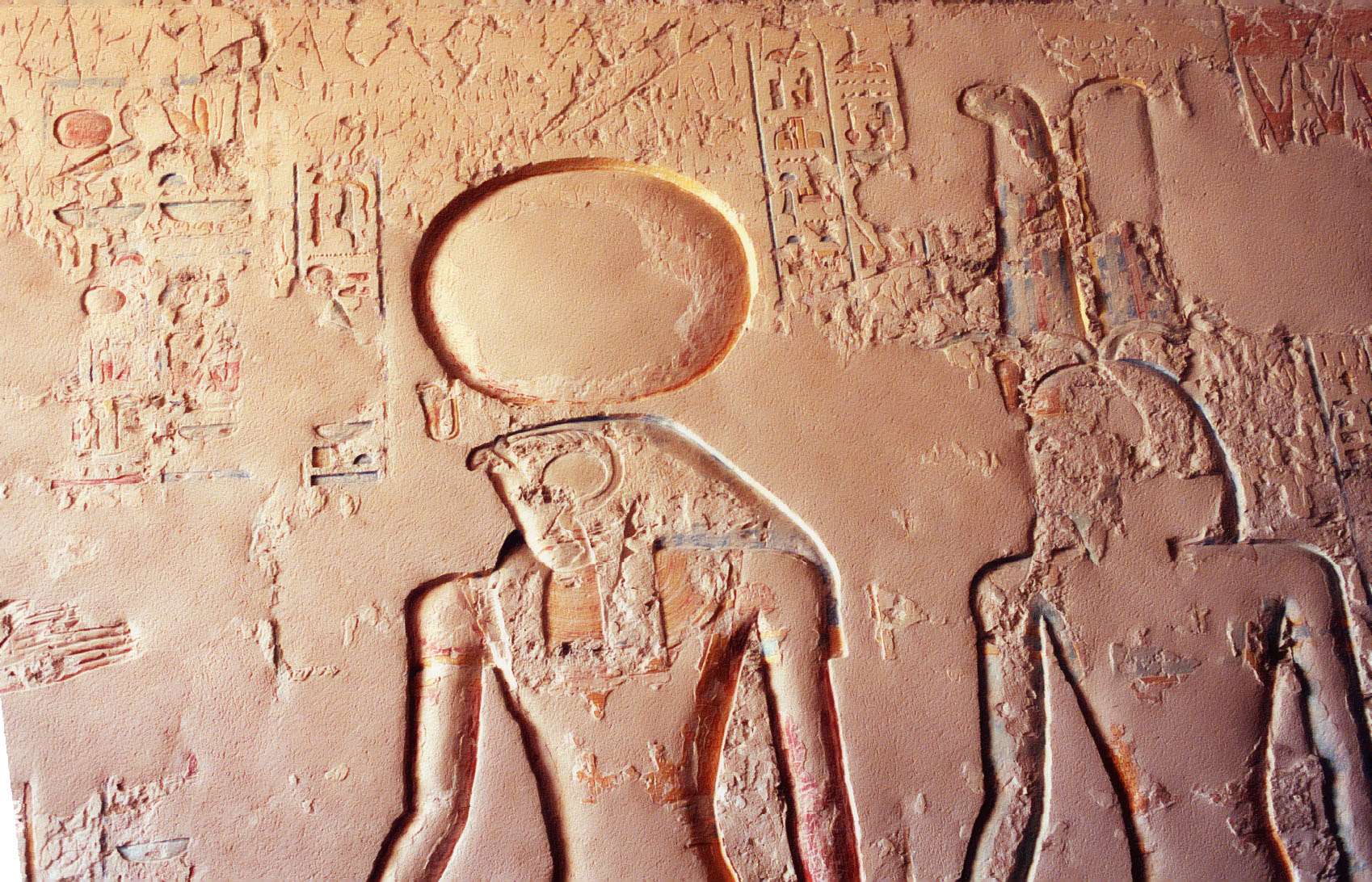
Ra and Amun, from the tomb of Ramses IV

The god of wind Amun came to be identified with the solar god Ra and the god of fertility and creation Min, so that Amun-Ra had the main characteristic of a solar god, creator god and fertility god. He also adopted the aspect of the ram from the Nubian solar god, besides numerous other titles and aspects.

As Amun-Ra, he was petitioned for mercy by those who believed their suffering had come about as a result of their own or others' wrongdoing.

Amun-Ra "who hears the prayer, who comes at the cry of the poor and distressed ... . Beware of him! Repeat him to son and daughter, to great and small; relate him to generations of generations who have not yet come into being; relate him to fishes in the deep, to birds in heaven; repeat him to him who does not know him and to him who knows him ... . Though it may be that the servant is normal in doing wrong, yet the Lord is normal in being merciful. The Lord of Thebes does not spend an entire day angry. As for his anger – in the completion of a moment there is no remnant ... . As thy Ka endures! thou wilt be merciful!

In the Leiden hymns, Amun, Ptah, and Re are regarded as a trinity who are distinct gods but with unity in plurality.

"The three gods are one yet the Egyptian elsewhere insists on the separate identity of each of the three."

This unity in plurality is expressed in one text:

All gods are three: Amun, Re, and Ptah, whom none equals. He who hides his name as Amun, he appears to the face as Re, his body is Ptah.

Henri Frankfort suggested that Amun was originally a wind god and speculating pointed out that the implicit connection between the winds and mysteriousness was paralleled in a passage from the Gospel of John:

"The wind blows where it wishes, and you hear the sound of it, but do not know where it comes from and where it is going."

A Leiden hymn to Amun describes how he calms stormy seas for the troubled sailor:

The tempest moves aside for the sailor who remembers the name of Amon. The storm becomes a sweet breeze for he who invokes His name ... Amon is more effective than millions for he who places Him in his heart. Thanks to Him the single man becomes stronger than a crowd.

== Third Intermediate Period ==
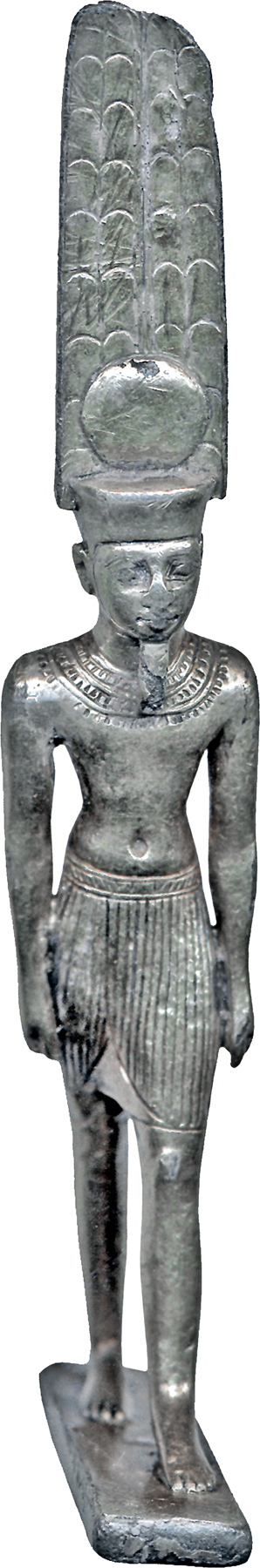
This Third Intermediate Period amulet from the Walters Art Museum depicts Amun fused with the solar deity, Re, thereby making the supreme solar deity Amun-Re.

=== Theban High Priests of Amun ===
While not regarded as a dynasty, the High Priests of Amun at Thebes were nevertheless of such power and influence that they were effectively the rulers of Egypt from 1080 to c. 943 BC. By the time Herihor was proclaimed as the first ruling High Priest of Amun in 1080 BC—in the 19th Year of Ramesses XI—the Amun priesthood exercised an effective hold on Egypt's economy. The Amun priests owned two-thirds of all the temple lands in Egypt and 90 percent of her ships and many other resources. Consequently, the Amun priests were as powerful as the pharaoh, if not more so. One of the sons of the High Priest Pinedjem would eventually assume the throne and rule Egypt for almost half a century as pharaoh Psusennes I, while the Theban High Priest Psusennes III would take the throne as king Psusennes II—the final ruler of the 21st Dynasty.

=== Decline ===
In the 10th century BC, the overwhelming dominance of Amun over all of Egypt gradually began to decline. In Thebes, however, his worship continued unabated, especially under the Nubian Twenty-fifth Dynasty of Egypt, as Amun was by now seen as a national god in Nubia. The Temple of Amun, Jebel Barkal, founded during the New Kingdom, came to be the center of the religious ideology of the Kingdom of Kush. The Victory Stele of Piye at Gebel Barkal (8th century BC) now distinguishes between an "Amun of Napata" and an "Amun of Thebes". Tantamani (died 653 BC), the last pharaoh of the Nubian dynasty, still bore a theophoric name referring to Amun in the Nubian form Amani.

== Iron Age and classical antiquity ==
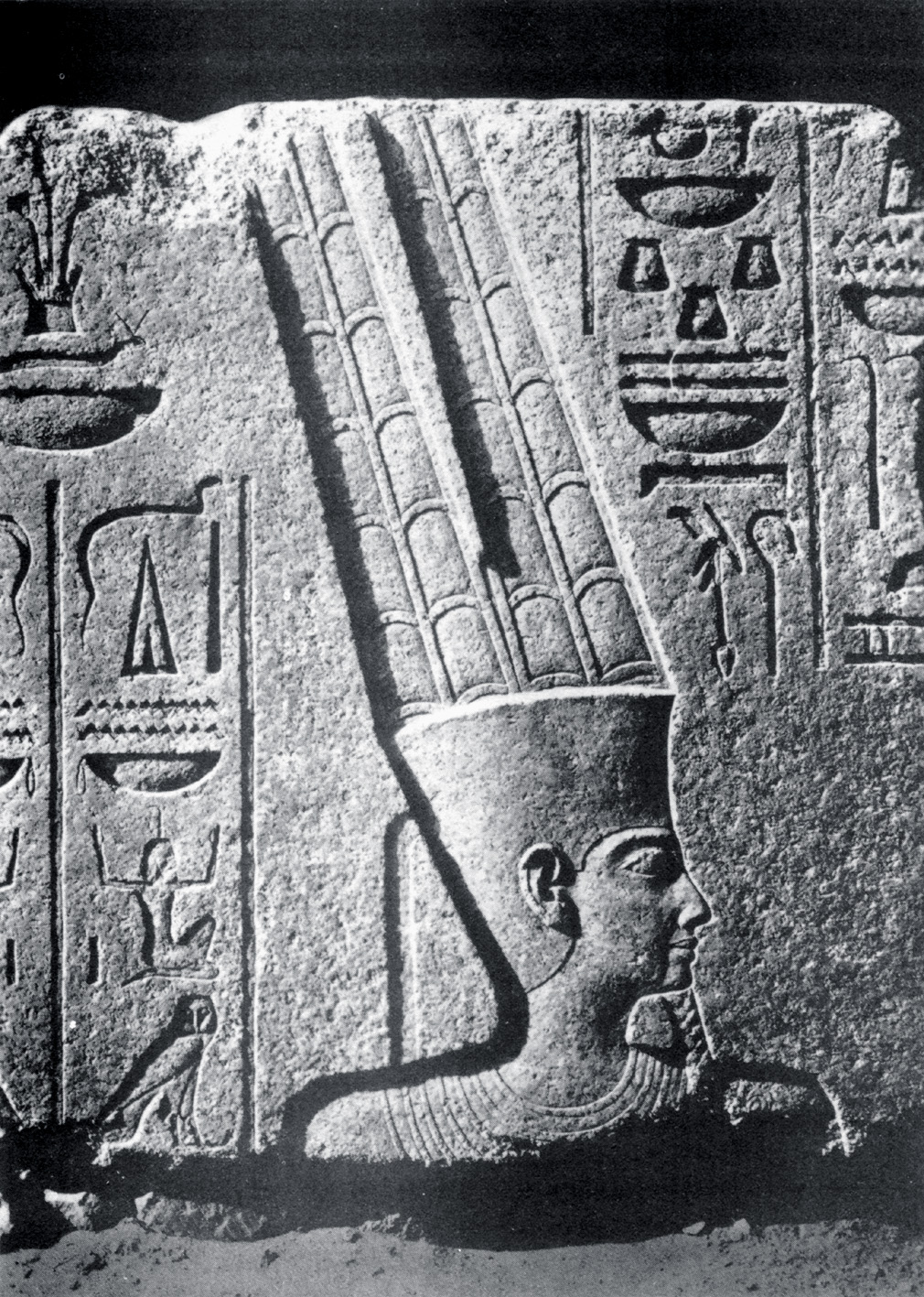
Depiction of Amun in a relief at Karnak (15th century BC)

=== Nubia and Sudan ===
Areas outside Egypt continued to worship him into classical antiquity. In Nubia, where his name was pronounced Amane or Amani (written in meroitic hieroglyphs as "𐦀𐦉𐦊𐦂" and in cursive as "𐦠𐦨𐦩𐦢"), he remained a national deity, with his priests, at Meroe and Nobatia, regulating the whole government of the country via an oracle, choosing the ruler, and directing military expeditions. According to Diodorus Siculus, these religious leaders were even able to compel kings to commit suicide, although this tradition stopped when Arkamane, in the 3rd century BC, slew them.

In Sudan, excavation of an Amun temple at Dangeil began in 2000 under the directorship of Drs Salah Mohamed Ahmed and Julie R. Anderson of the National Corporation for Antiquities and Museums (NCAM), Sudan and the British Museum, UK, respectively. The temple was found to have been destroyed by fire, and accelerator mass spectrometry (AMS) and C14 dating of the charred roof beams have placed the construction of the most recent incarnation of the temple in the 1st century AD. This date is further confirmed by the associated ceramics and inscriptions. Following its destruction, the temple gradually decayed and collapsed.

One of the most famous temples dedicated to Amun in Nubia is at Jebel Barkal, located near the bank of the Nile just above the 4th cataract. Built out of and around a large sandstone mound, an early iteration of the temple was made of mudbrick by Thutmose III. During the reign of Akhenaten, talatat blocks were used to create the first part of the enduring monumental structure consisting of the outer court, pylon, and inner shrine. Expansions to the courtyard and forecourt were planned and construction started under Ramesses II, but ultimately were left incomplete. The pinnacle of the temple is a large, solid piece of rock protruding from the sandstone mound, and is commonly thought to symbolize either a Uraeus or the White Crown of Upper Egypt. Egyptian occupiers of Nubia believed the mountain housed a primeval form of Amun of Karnak, calling Jebel Barkal “Nswt-TꜢwy” the “Thrones of the Two Lands.”

This is in reference to the intertwined religious and political importance attributed to the temple by both the native Nubians and the Egyptian occupiers, the latter of whom went to great lengths to establish a connection between their new empire and the people they subjugated. The site became known as a primal source of divine kingship, and association with the cult of Amun centered at Jebel Barkal helped to legitimize the ruler of Upper Egypt. Initially utilized to support rule by Egyptian conquerors, the ideal continued after the collapse of the 25th dynasty. The strategic location of Jebel Barkal coupled with the religious power associated with the cult of Amun at the temple led Kushite kings such as Piankhy to hold their seat of power at Jebel Barkal even as their empire extended through the Nile delta.

=== Siwa Oasis and Libya ===
In Siwa Oasis, located in Western Egypt, there remained a solitary oracle of Amun near the Libyan Desert. The worship of Ammon was introduced into Greece at an early period, probably through the medium of the Greek colony in Cyrene, which must have formed a connection with the great oracle of Ammon in the Oasis soon after its establishment. Iarbas, a mythological king of Libya, was also considered a son of Hammon.

According to the 6th century AD author Corippus, a Libyan people known as the Laguatan carried an effigy of their god Gurzil, whom they believed to be the son of Ammon, into battle against the Byzantine Empire in the 540s AD.

=== Levant ===
Amun is mentioned in the Hebrew Bible as אמון מנא Amon of No in Jeremiah 46:25 (also translated the horde of No and the horde of Alexandria), and Thebes possibly is called נא אמון No-Amon in Nahum 3:8 (also translated populous Alexandria). These texts were presumably written in the 7th century BC.

The Lord of hosts, the God of Israel, said: "Behold, I am bringing punishment upon Amon of Thebes, and Pharaoh and Egypt and her gods and her kings, upon Pharaoh and those who trust in him."

— Jeremiah 46:25 (KJV)

=== Greece ===
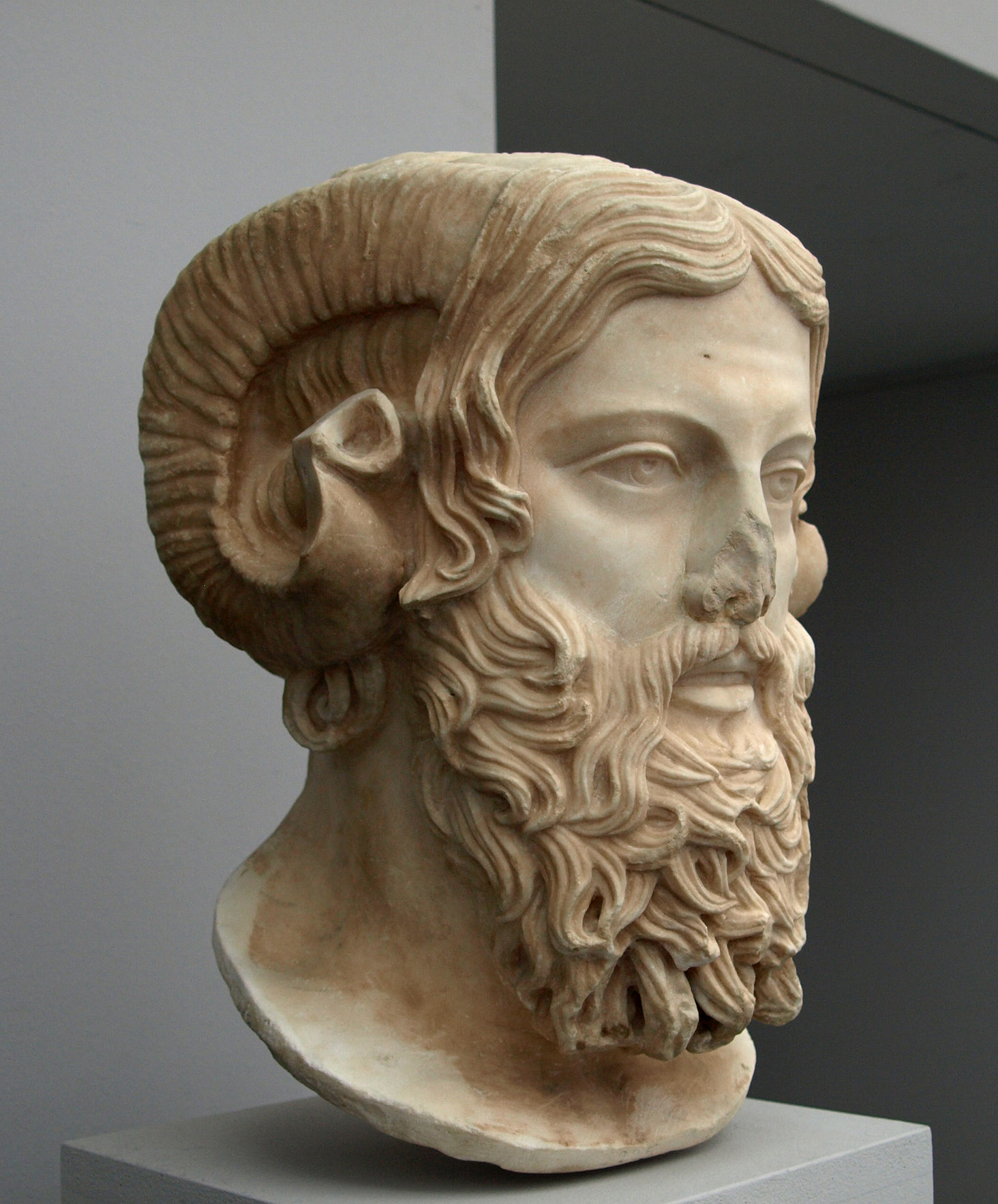
Zeus-Ammon. Roman copy of a Greek original from the late 5th century BC. The Greeks of the lower Nile Delta and Cyrenaica combined features of supreme god Zeus with features of the Egyptian god Amun-Ra.

Amun, worshipped by the Greeks as Ammon of Heliopolis, (meaning "city of the sun god") had a temple and a statue, the gift of Pindar (d. 443 BC), at Thebes, and another at Sparta, the inhabitants of which, as Pausanias says, consulted the oracle of Ammon in Libya from early times more than the other Greeks. At Aphytis, Chalcidice, Amun was worshipped, from the time of Lysander (d. 395 BC), as zealously as in Ammonium. Pindar the poet honored the god with a hymn. At Megalopolis the god was represented with the head of a ram (Paus. viii.32 § 1), and the Greeks of Cyrenaica dedicated at Delphi a chariot with a statue of Ammon.

When Alexander the Great occupied Egypt in late 332 BC, he was regarded as a liberator, thus conquering Egypt without a fight. He was pronounced son of Amun by the oracle at Siwa. Amun was identified as a form of Zeus and Alexander often referred to Zeus-Ammon as his true father, and after his death, currency depicted him adorned with the Horns of Ammon as a symbol of his divinity. The tradition of depicting Alexander the Great with the horns of Amun continued for centuries, with someone who was possibly Alexander being referred to in the Quran as "Dhu al-Qarnayn" (The Two-Horned One), a reference to his depiction on Middle Eastern coins and statuary as having horns of Ammon.

Several words derive from Amun via the Greek form, Ammon, such as ammonia and ammonite. The Romans called the ammonium chloride they collected from deposits near the Temple of Jupiter-Amun in ancient Libya sal ammoniacus (salt of Amun) because of proximity to the nearby temple. Ammonia, as well as being the chemical, is a genus name in the foraminifera. Both these foraminiferans (shelled Protozoa) and ammonites (extinct shelled cephalopods) bear spiral shells resembling a ram's, and Ammon's, horns. The regions of the hippocampus in the brain are called the cornu ammonis – literally "Amun's Horns", due to the horned appearance of the dark and light bands of cellular layers.

A Greek interpretation for why Amun is sometimes depicted with the head of a ram comes from Herodotus. He recounts a myth where Amun, urged by his son Khonsu to reveal his true form, concealed himself behind a ram's fleece while manifesting. This clever disguise allowed Amun to partially fulfill his son's request without fully exposing his true nature.

== See also ==
- List of solar deities

== Sources ==
- Budge, E. A. W. (1923). Tutankhamen: Amenism, Atenism, and Egyptian Monotheism. New York: Dodd, Mead & Co. – via sacred-texts.com.
- Klotz, David (2006). Adoration of the Ram: Five Hymns to Amun-Re from Hibis Temple. Yale Egyptological Studies. Vol. 6. New Haven: Yale Egyptological Seminar. ISBN 978-1-950343-02-7.
- Warburton, David (2012). Architecture, Power, and Religion: Hatshepsut, Amun and Karnak in Context. Lit. ISBN 978-3-643-90235-1.
