= Madiqen =

Nubian queen

Madiqen was a Nubian queen with the Egyptian titles king's wife, king's wife of the living and king's sister. Her mother was queen Nasalsa. Her father was most likely king Senkamanisken. Her royal husband is not known for sure, but Aspelta and Anlamani are most likely options. Madiqen is known from her burial at Nuri (Nu 27) . Her burial consisted of a pyramid with a small chapel in front of it. There is a staircase going down to the two burial chambers that were found looted. Gold foil and alabaster vessels were found. There were also 80 shabtis providing her name and title. On a stela of Aspelta is mentioned that she was promoted by the king to the position of a songtress of Amun at Napata. This position was then given to her daughter Henuttakhebit.
