= Amanimalel =

Kushite queen

- Queen consort of Nubia
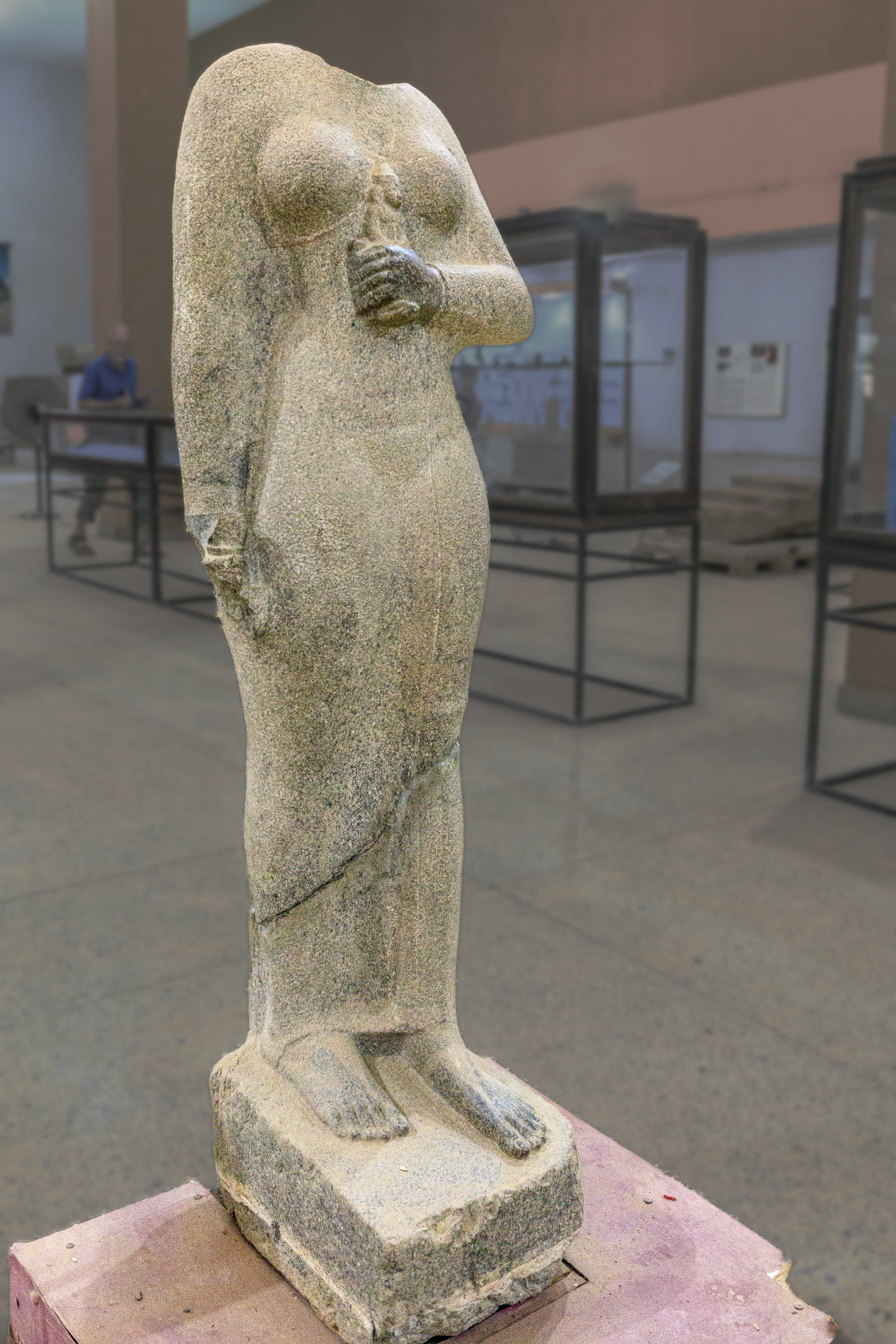
- Granite statue of Amanimalel from Jebel Barkal, now in the National Museum of Sudan
- Burial: uncertain, perhaps pyramid 22 at Nuri
- Spouse: uncertain, possibly Senkamanisken
- Issue: uncertain, possibly queens Asata and Madekan
< i mn n m r nfr n r >
- Dynasty: Kingdom of Kush
- Father: uncertain, Atlanersa

Amanimalel (also Amanimalēl and Amanimalil) was a Kushite queen of the Napatan kingdom of Nubia, likely a spouse of king Senkamanisken living in the second half of the 7th century BC. She is mostly known from one or possibly two statues of her of very high quality.

== Chronology and family ==
Amanimalel lived in the second half of the 7th century BC. Several dates have been proposed for her queenship based on those estimated for Senkamanisken's rule: 643–623 BC, or 642–623 BC.

Amanimalel is presumed to have been a queen consort of Senkamanisken, who was also married to queen Nasalsa and, possibly, Masalaye. As such, Amanimalel could be the mother of queens Asata and Madekan who espoused kings Aspelta and Anlamani, respectively. These possibilities are debated however because of the lack of direct evidence on the matter. Amanimalel's parents are equally uncertain, she could be a daughter of Atlanersa.

== Attestations ==
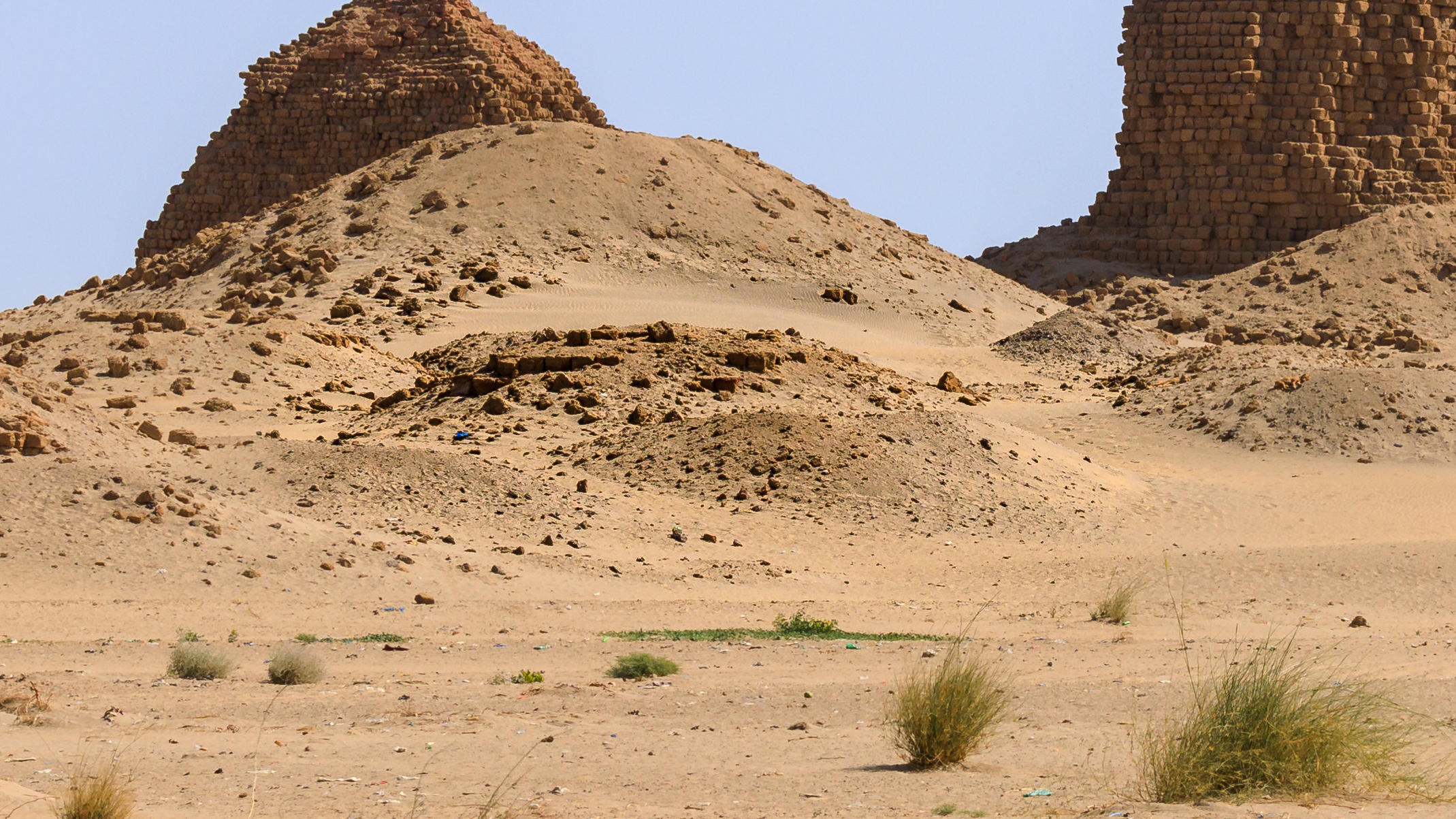
Middle to foreground: pyramid Nuri 22, conjecturally attributed to Amanimalel.

Amanimalel is attested by a 141 cm (4.63 ft) high lifesize statue of the queen, which was uncovered in April 1916 by George Andrew Reisner in a cache at the Gebel Barkal temple B 500 during a joint Harvard University–Boston Museum of Fine Arts expedition. The statue, one of the great masterpieces of African art, shows the queen in a traditionally Egyptian striding pose, wearing a Nubian variation of an Egyptian dress that could have been sheathed in silver while the feet may have been adorned with golden sandals. The back pillar of the statue states that she is "beloved of Amun of Napata who resides in the sacred mountain", showing that the queen participated in the cult of Amun at Napata in a role that might have been related with that of God's Wife of Amun of the preceding Twenty-Fifth Dynasty. The inscription was under the aegis of a goddess whose portrait is damaged but may belong to Mut. The queen is shown holding a smaller statue of a god child wearing the double crown who might well be Khonsu, a son of Amun at Thebes, thereby associating the queen closely with the triad Amun, Mut and Khonsu.

A second, very similar, quartzite statue is located at the Neues Museum of Berlin and is thought to belong to Amanimalel owing to the close resemblance between both representations.

== Tomb ==
The tomb of queen Amanimalel has not been identified with any certainty. Reisner proposed that pyramid 22 at the royal necropolis of Nuri belongs to her. The pyramid was excavated in 1917. These works unearthed fragments of gold foil, small silver artefacts and beads.

== References and sources ==
=== Sources ===
- Bianchi, Robert Steven (2004). Daily life of the Nubians. The Greenwood press daily life through history series. Westport (Connecticut), London: Greenwood Press. ISBN 9780313325014.
- Dunham, Dows; Macadam, Laming (1949). "Names and Relationships of the Royal Family of Napata". The Journal of Egyptian Archaeology. 35: 139–149. doi:10.2307/3855222. JSTOR 3855222.
- Eldamaty, Mamdouh Mohamed; Trad, Mai (2004). Egyptian Museum Collections Around the World, Volume 2. Studies for the Centennial of the Egyptian Museum, Cairo. The American University in Cairo Press, Supreme Council of Antiquities. ISBN 978-9774247774.
- Hill, Marsha; Schorsch, Deborah (2007). Gifts for the gods: images from Egyptian temples. New York, New Haven: Metropolitan Museum of Art, Yale University Press. OCLC 608061741.
- Lobban, Richard (2004). Historical dictionary of ancient and medieval Nubia. Historical dictionaries of ancient civilizations and historical eras. Vol. 10. Lanham, Md.: Scarecrow Press. ISBN 9780810865785.
- "Napatanerin: Statue einer kuschitischen Königin". Society for the promotion of the Egyptian Museum Berlin. "Catalog number VÄGM 2008/131"
- "Nuri, pyramid XXII". Boston Museum of Fine Arts.
- Wildung, Dietrich; Der Manuelian, Peter; Guillaume, Kathleen (1997). Sudan: ancient kingdoms of the Nile. Paris: Institut du Monde Arabe. ISBN 9782080136374.
- Ziegler, Christiane (2008). Queens of Egypt: from Hetepheres to Cleopatra. Paris: Somogy Art Publication. ISBN 9782757201909.
