= Maletaral =

Nubian queen

Maletaral (also Maloraral) (reading of the name is uncertain) was a Nubian queen with the Egyptian title king's mother. She was perhaps the wife of king Atlanersa and the mother of king Senkamanisken. Maletaral is known from a heart scarab found in a burial at Nuri (Nu 41). Her burial consisted of a pyramid with a small chapel in front of it. There is a staircase going down to the two burial chambers that were found looted. Gold foil and pottery vessels were found. There were also 283 shabtis. They were uninscribed. Burial goods from different tombs in the cemetery of Nuri were often found far away from the actual burial. Therefore it must remain uncertain whether tomb Nuri 41 really belonged to Maletaral, as only one object with her name was found.
