= Atlanersa =

Kushite king of the Napatan kingdom of Nubia in the 7th century BC

- Atlanersa
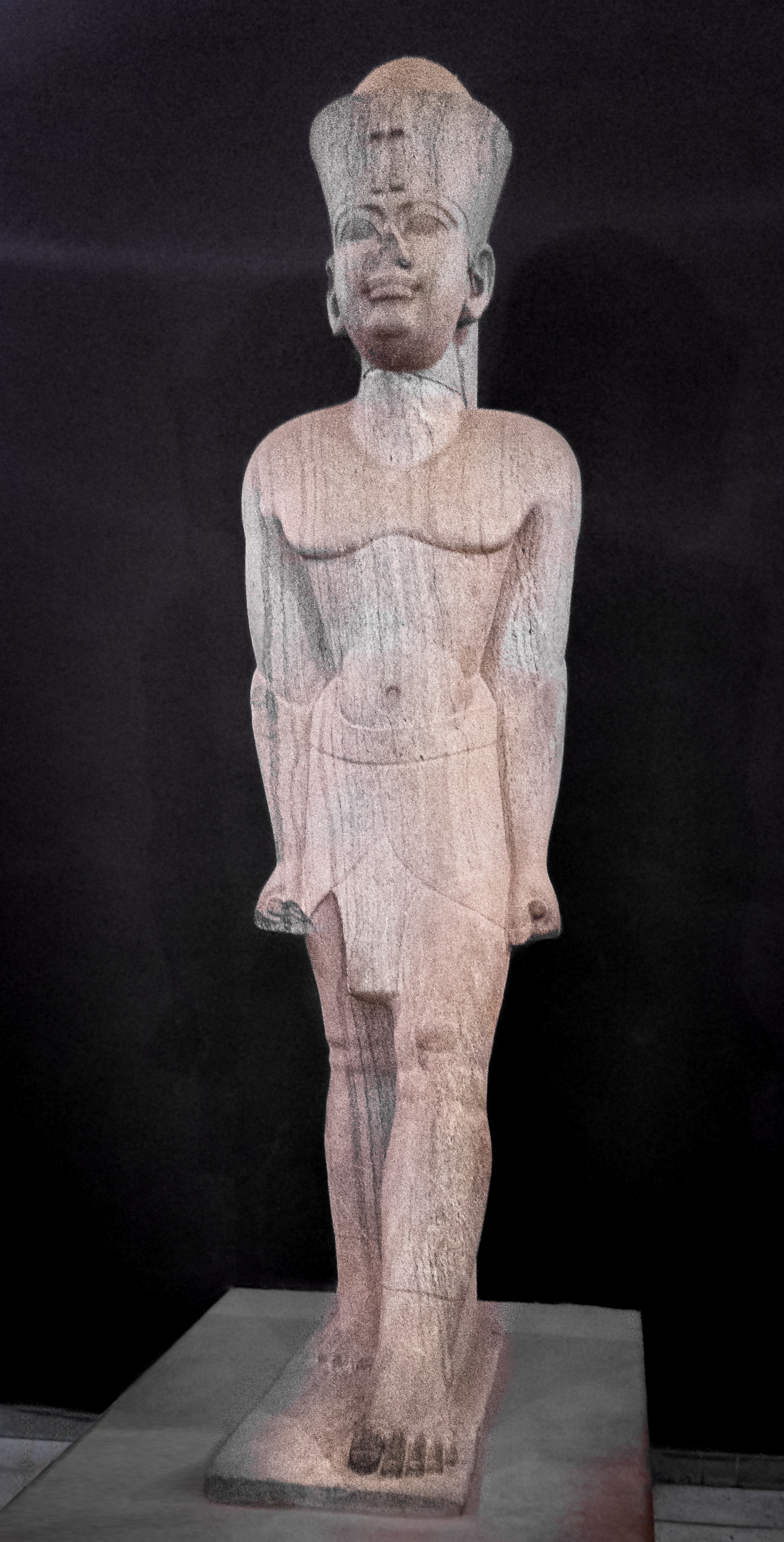
- Photo of the colossal granite statue of Atlanersa from his Osiris-Dedwen temple at Jebel Barkal, in the National Museum of Sudan taken in the year 2020

Kushite king of Napata
- Reign: c. 653–643 BC
- Predecessor: Tantamani
- Successor: Senkamanisken
Royal titulary
Horus name
Geregtawy
Founder of (the) Two Lands
U17 N19
Nebty name
Merymaat
Beloved of Maat
mr i i U2 t C10
Golden Horus
Semenhepu
Who establishes the laws
s mn n Y1 h p w Z3
Prenomen
Khukare
Protected by the ka of Ra
Alternative translations:
The ka of Ra protects (me)
Ra, One whose ka is protected
< N5 Aa1 D43 D28 >
Nomen
Atlanersa (tỉ.l.n.r.sa)

G39 N5	ti rw n r Aa18
- Consorts: Khaliset, Malotaral, Yeturow; Uncertain: Peltasen, Taba[..], K[...], Amenirdis II
- Children: Nasalsa ♀ Uncertain: Senkamanisken ♂ Conjectural: Amanimalel ♀
- Father: Taharqa or less likely Tantamani
- Mother: Queen [..]salka
- Born: c. 671 BC
- Died: c. 643 BC
- Burial: Nuri (probably Nu. 20)
- Monuments: Pyramid Nuri 20; Jebel Barkal Temple B700; Uncertain: mortuary chapel Nuri 500

Atlanersa (also Atlanarsa) was a Kushite ruler of the Napatan kingdom of Nubia, reigning for about a decade in the mid-7th century BC. He was the successor of Tantamani, the last ruler of the 25th Dynasty of Egypt, and possibly a son of Taharqa or less likely of Tantamani, while his mother was a queen whose name is only partially preserved. Atlanersa's reign immediately followed the collapse of Nubian control over Egypt, which witnessed the Assyrian conquest of Egypt and then the beginning of the Late Period under Psamtik I. The same period also saw the progressive cultural integration of Egyptian beliefs by the Kushite civilization.

Atlanersa may have fathered his successor Senkamanisken with his consort Malotaral, although Senkamanisken could also be his brother. He built a pyramid in the necropolis of Nuri, now conjecturally believed to be Nuri 20 and may also have started a funerary chapel in the same necropolis, now called Nuri 500. Atlanersa was the second Nubian king to build a pyramid in Nuri after Taharqa. Excavations of his pyramid produced many small artefacts which are now on display in the Museum of Fine Arts in Boston, US. Atlanersa's most-prominent construction is his temple to the syncretic god Osiris-Dedwen in Jebel Barkal called B700, which he finished and had time to only partially decorate. This suggests that he died unexpectedly. The temple entrance was to be flanked with two colossal statues of the king, one of which was completed and set in place and is now in the National Museum of Sudan.

== Royal family ==
=== Parents ===
Atlanersa was the son of king Taharqa or less probably of Atlanersa's immediate predecessor Tantamani. (Note: A hypothesis in which Atlanersa is Shebitku's son was also considered but discounted based on an analysis of the inheritances in the 25th Dynasty royal family.) Specialists, such as László Török, who contend that Atlanersa's father was Taharqa, explain the intervening reign of Tantamani by positing that Atlanersa might have been too young to ascend the throne at the death of his father and that attempting a military reconquest of Egypt required a strong king. A cultural explanation is also possible: Napatan society might have recognized seniority and maturity as valid arguments for inheriting a throne. In this sense a young heir to the throne would be overlooked in favor of someone older until they reached maturity. At this point, should the king die, the right to the throne of the original heir would be reinstated. If Atlanersa was indeed a son of Taharqa, then he was a cross-cousin of Tantamani.

Atlanersa's mother was a queen who appeared on a pylon scene at Jebel Barkal Temple B700 but whose name is not fully preserved and is only known to have ended in [...]salka. She bore the title of "Great one of the Imat-scepter, noblewoman".

=== Consorts and children ===
Atlanersa was married to at least two of his sisters: Yeturow, who bore the title of "wife of the king, daughter of the king, sister of the king, mistress of Egypt", and Khaliset (also known as Khalese) who was "noblewoman, lady of the Imat-sceptre, singer, great daughter of the king". (Note: Alternatively "Mistress of the Imat scepter, noblewoman, eldest daughter".) Khaliset was intended to be the mother of Atlanersa's heir, as indicated by her titles, but it may have been another of Atlanersa's consorts, Malotaral "mistress of Kush", who was the mother of Atlanersa's heir Senkamanisken. Further potential consorts of Atlanersa have been identified: his sister Peltasen and queens K[...] and Taba[...]. Finally, there is a distinct possibility that Amenirdis II, the Divine Adoratrice of Amun in Thebes, was married to Atlanersa. In addition, she may have been his sister.

One daughter of Atlanersa by one of his wives is known: Queen Nasalsa, sister-wife of Senkamanisken and mother of Anlamani and Aspelta. It is also possible that Queen Amanimalel was his daughter. Atlanersa's successor Senkamanisken (Note: That Senkamanisken was Atlanersa's immediate successor is notably indicated by the addition of Senkamanisken's name to Atlanersa's boat stand in Jebel Barkal Temple B700.) may have been his son, but could instead have been his brother.

== Attestations and activities ==
=== Temple B700 ===
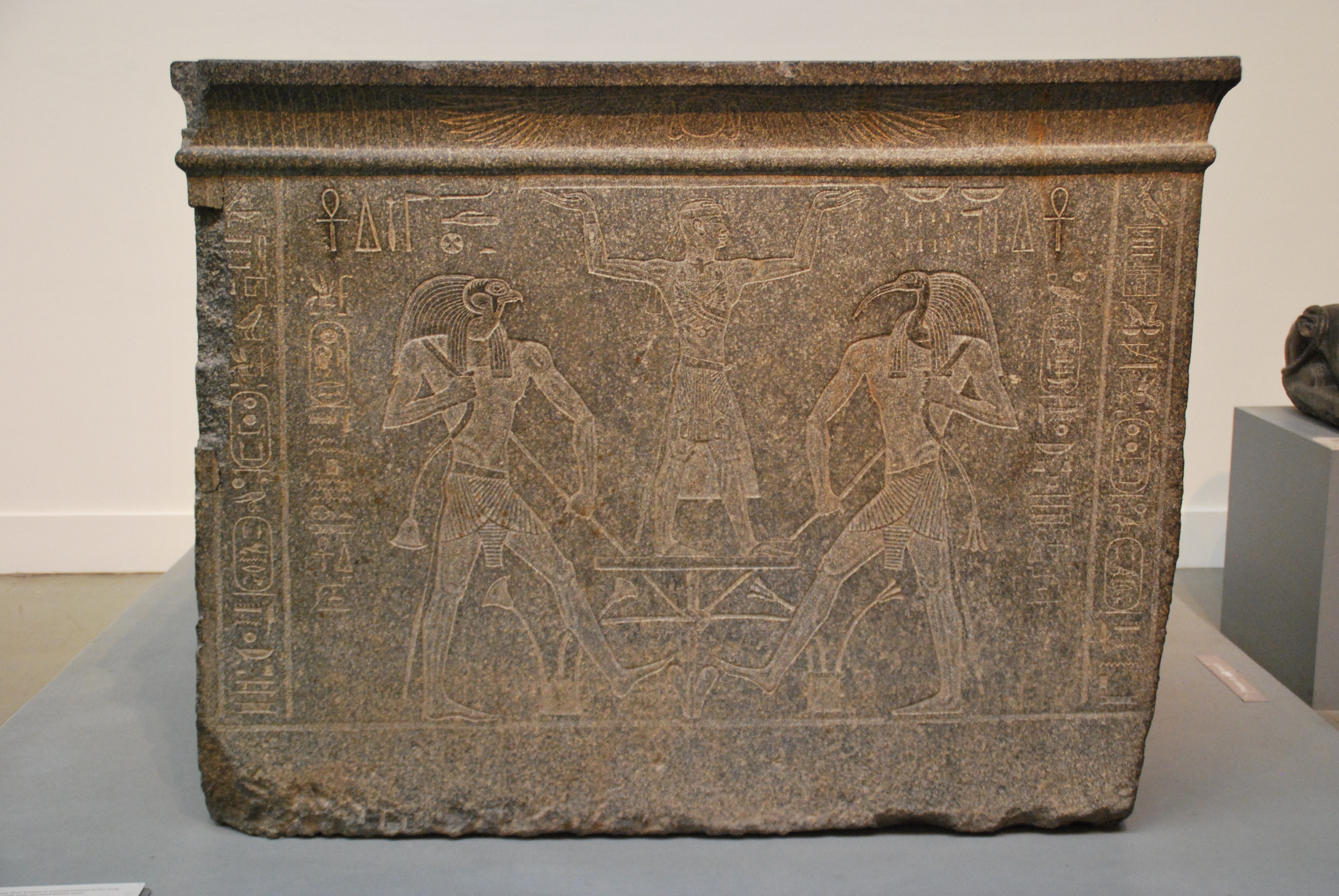
Barque stand from Temple B700 showing Horus (left) and Thoth (right) lifting Atlanersa, whose holding up the heavens, now in the Museum of Fine Arts in Boston

Foundation tablets bearing Atlanersa's name show that he started a temple dedicated to the syncretic god Osiris-Dedwen at Jebel Barkal, now known as B700. The choice for this location followed from its closeness to the "Pure Mountain"—the ancient name of Jebel Barkal—and the presence of a small New Kingdom chapel there. It is unclear whether Atlanersa ordered the destruction of this chapel to make place for B700, or whether the chapel was already ruined by this time.

The temple, now ruined, was entered through a pylon and comprised a small court followed by an inner sanctuary. The court and sanctuary both had four columns, with palm capitals and papyrus flower bundle capitals, respectively. The inner sanctuary was inscribed with a lengthy hymn to Osiris, possibly indirectly referring to the deceased Taharqa. The walls were further decorated with reliefs depicting the activities performed during the coronation of the king, almost all of which have now disappeared. Beneath two of the corners of the inner room were two foundation deposits buried at the start of the temple construction, notably with the tablets showing Atlanersa's name. A stand (Note: Originally, the archaeologist George Andrew Reisner, who excavated the necropolis of Nuri as well as the Jebel Barkal temples, believed that the stand was an altar. This understanding was later changed on reading the inscriptions on the stand.) for a sacred barque stood at the centre of the sanctuary. The stand is made of a single block of granite weighing over 8 t (8.8 short tons). The purpose of the stand was to support the barque of the god Amun of Napata when it visited the temple from the nearby Temple B500. (Note: This is directly stated by the hieroglyphs on the barque stand. They read: "Horus Geregtawy, Two Ladies Mery Maat, King of Upper and Lower Egypt Khukara, Son of Ra Atlanersa, beloved of Amun of Napata. He made (it as his monument for his father Amun-Ra Lord of the Thrones of the Two-lands, dwelling in Pure-mountain, making for him a stand of granite so that he might rest on it on his great throne and give him all life, power, and all health for ever. Golden Horus Semenhepu, King of Upper and Lower Egypt Khukare, Son of Ra Atlanersa, beloved of Amun-Ra, Lord of the Thrones of Two-lands. Speech by Amun of Napata [to] the Son of Ra Atlanersa 'My heart is greatly content with what you do for me.' Speech by Amun-Ra, Lord of Thrones of Two-lands, to his beloved son Atlanersa, 'I give you Upper and Lower Egypt Two-lands in exchange for this monument'. (Speech by Meret), 'which your beloved son, the Son of Ra Atlanersa has made for you that you may rest on [it]; may he make you living for ever.'")

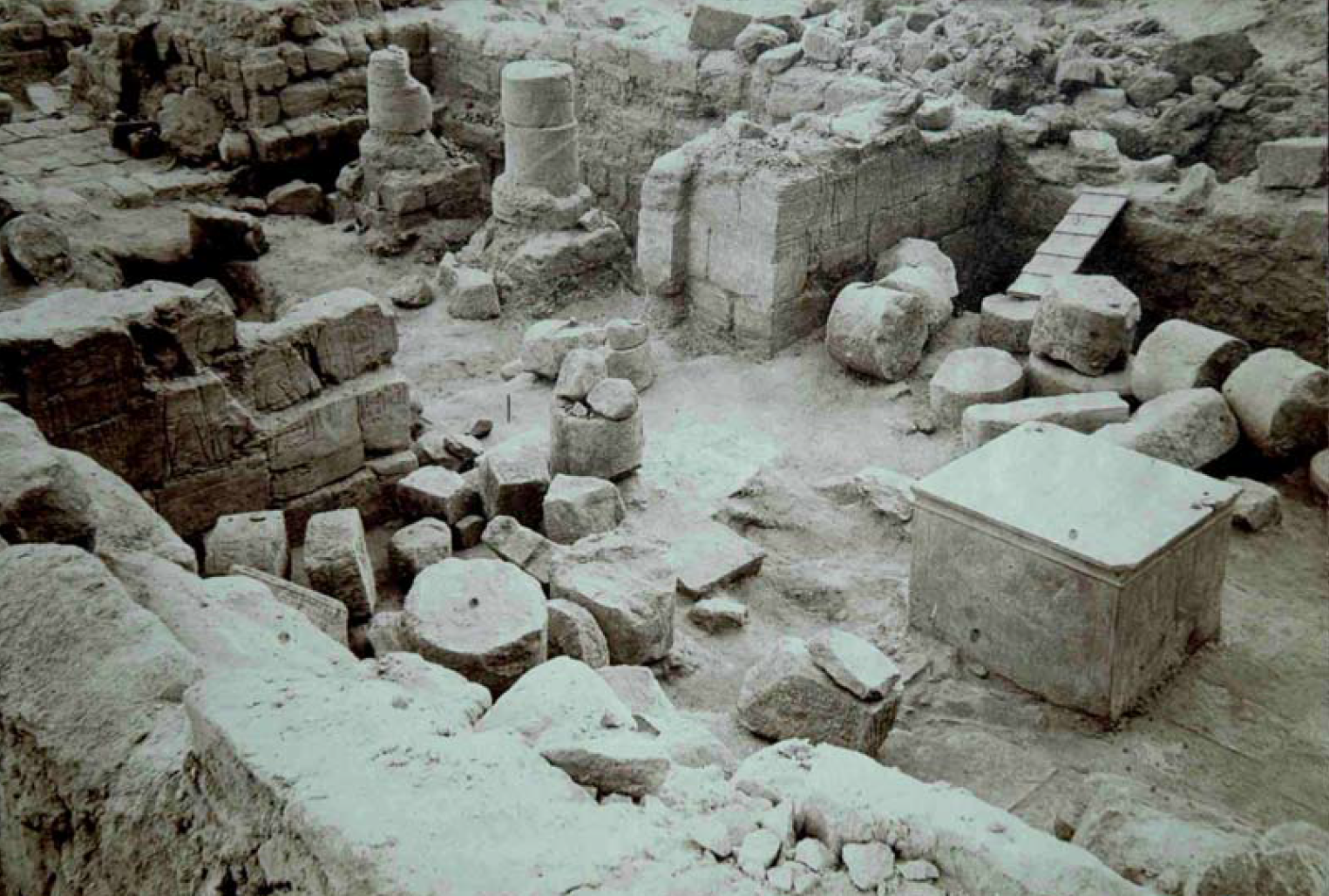
Boat stand of Atlanersa in situ in Temple B700 in 1916

Atlanersa's name was present on a scene inscribed on the front pylon of the temple, now destroyed. (Note: The pylon was still standing in the first half of the 19th century. Drawings of its decorations were made in 1820 and 1833 and some of its hieroglyphic inscriptions were copied in 1828. By the time of Reisner's excavations in Nubia c. 1916, it had disappeared owing to its stones being reused as construction material.) The decoration of the pylon was predominantly made during Senkamanisken's reign, yet it depicted queens Yeturow, K[...] and Khaliset, who are implied to be both Atlanersa's wives as well as his sisters. Finally, Atlanersa's name is written on a granite altar from the same temple.

The progression of the temple construction suggests that Atlanersa died unexpectedly, shortly after completing the construction works and the decoration of the two interior rooms—as attested by the presence of his name there—but before completing the decoration of the exterior. This task was finished under Senkamanisken who added inscriptions of his own on the columns and front pylon, and donated a small obelisk. A colossal statue of Atlanersa was placed on the western side of the temple entrance, where it was discovered by Reisner, albeit toppled with its head cut-off. It is now in the National Museum of Sudan.

Reliefs on the barque stand and on the sanctuary walls show Atlanersa holding up the heavens and performing the ceremony of uniting the two lands, originally solely a part of the coronation of Egyptian pharaohs but subsequently an integral part of the Kushite royal legitimation. Thus, Atlanersa ruled at a pivotal time which saw the cultural integration of Egyptian concepts and institutional continuity between the 25th Dynasty state and the subsequent Napatan kingdom of Kush. This further indicates that, originally, the temple's importance lay in its role during the accession of a king to the throne: following the death of his predecessor, the king went to the temple "in order to be confirmed in his new role by Amun and giving the office of kingship renewed life". After Senkamanisken's rule, the temple might have served as a mortuary temple for Atlanersa and, even later, for all deceased Kushite kings.

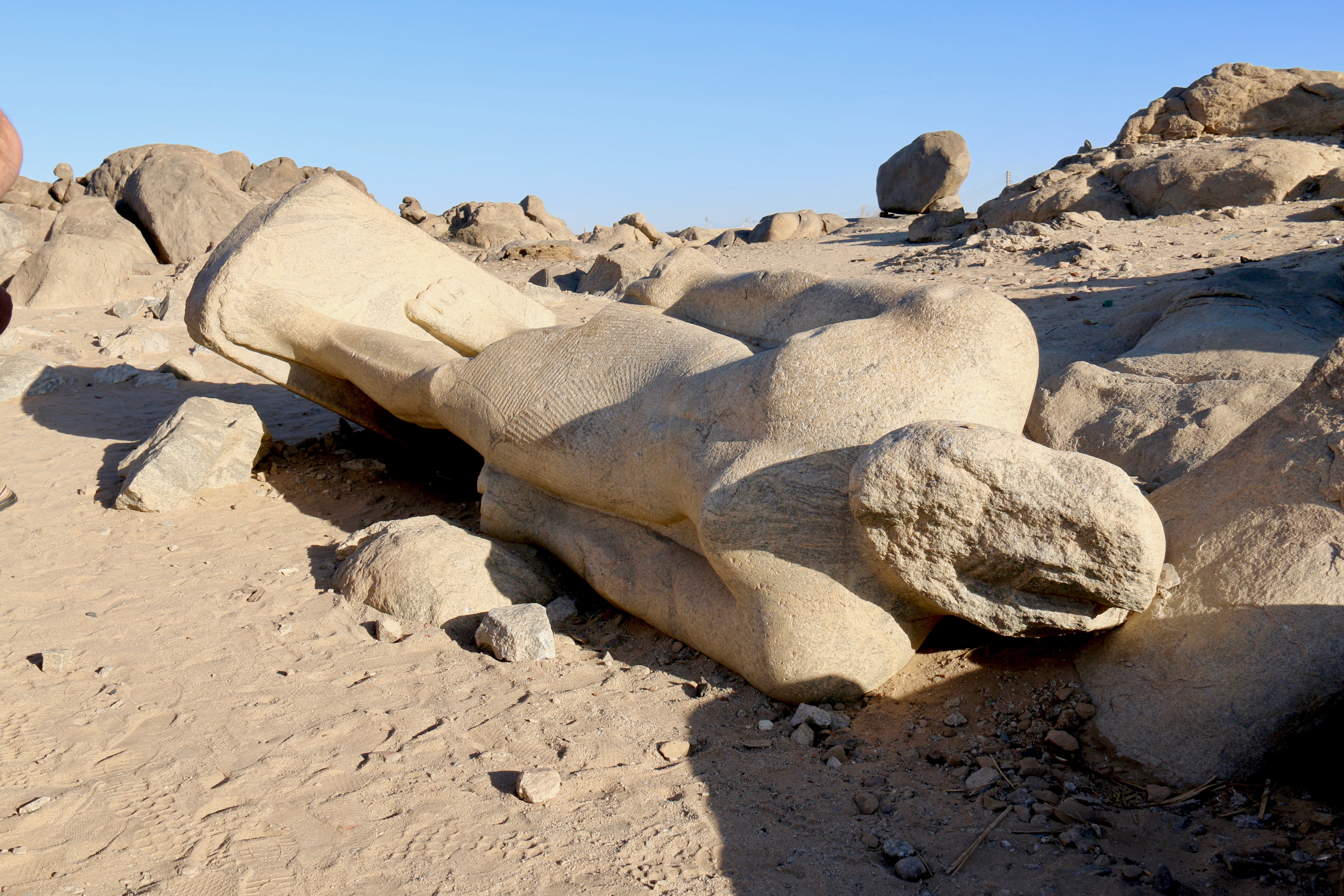
Unfinished statue in a quarry at Tombos, in all probability representing Atlanersa

=== Temple B500 ===
Atlanersa is the only Kushite king of the mid-7th century BC whose statue was absent from the statue cache uncovered in Jebel Barkal Temple B500 by George Andrew Reisner in 1916. Statues of Tantamani, Senkamanisken, Anlamani and Aspelta were uncovered there.

=== Old Dongola, Tombos and Thebes ===
A scarab seal of Atlanersa, now in the Louvre Museum, may originate from Thebes. At Old Dongola, a fragmentary obelisk bearing Atlanersa's name was discovered in a church, where it had been reused as a column.

In a quarry near Tombos, a statue of the same size and shape and made of the same stone as the statue of Atlanersa from B700 was uncovered unfinished, almost certainly left there because it had cracked. The statue was likely destined to be the eastern pendant of the colossal statue at the west of the entrance of B700 and therefore represents Atlanersa. (Note: In a 1947 article, Dows Dunham disagrees that the two statues are similar and sees the Tombos statue as one of Tantamani instead.)

== Tomb ==
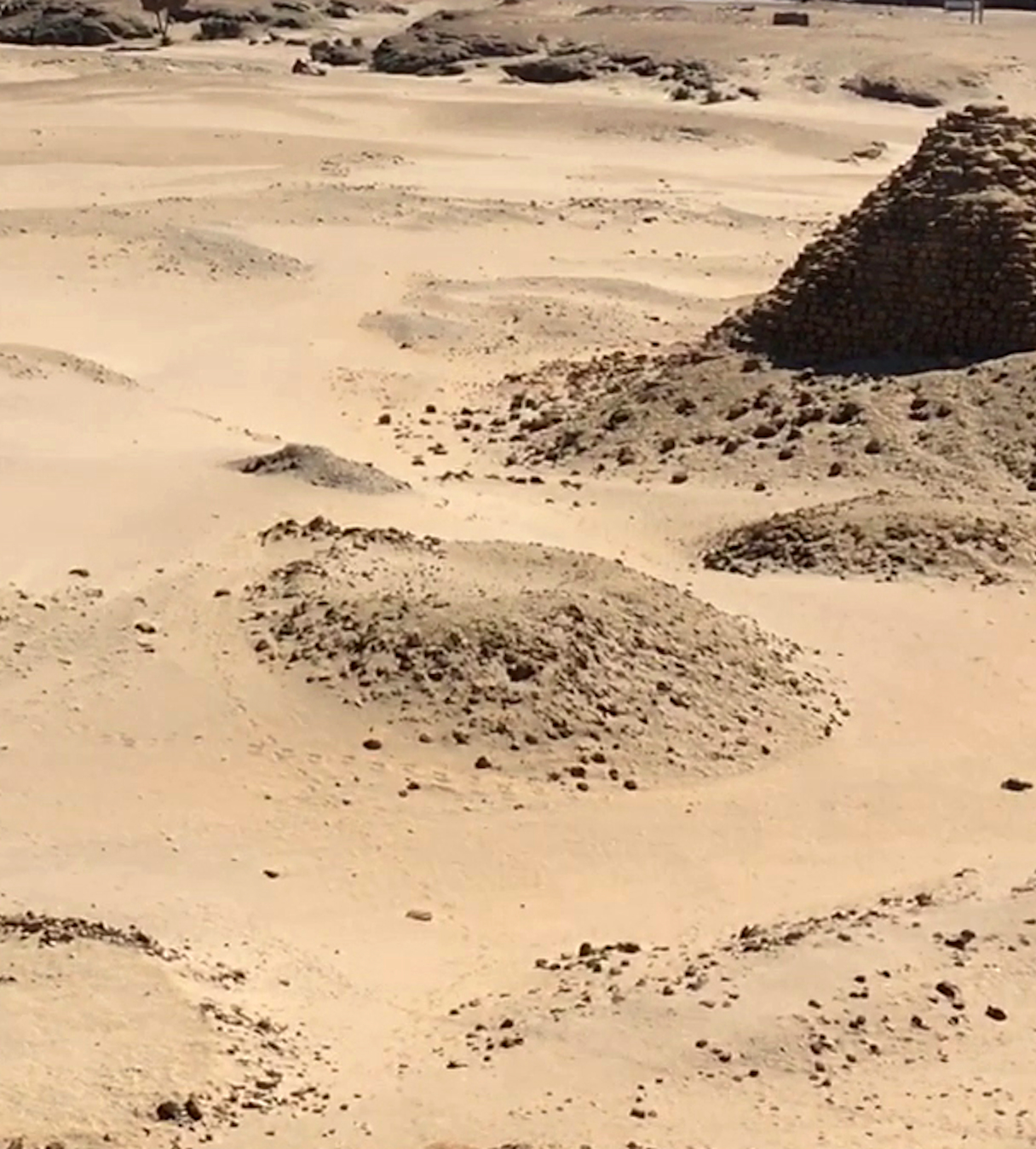
Ruins of pyramid Nuri 20 of Atlanersa (center) next to standing pyramid Nuri 2 of Amaniastabarqa.

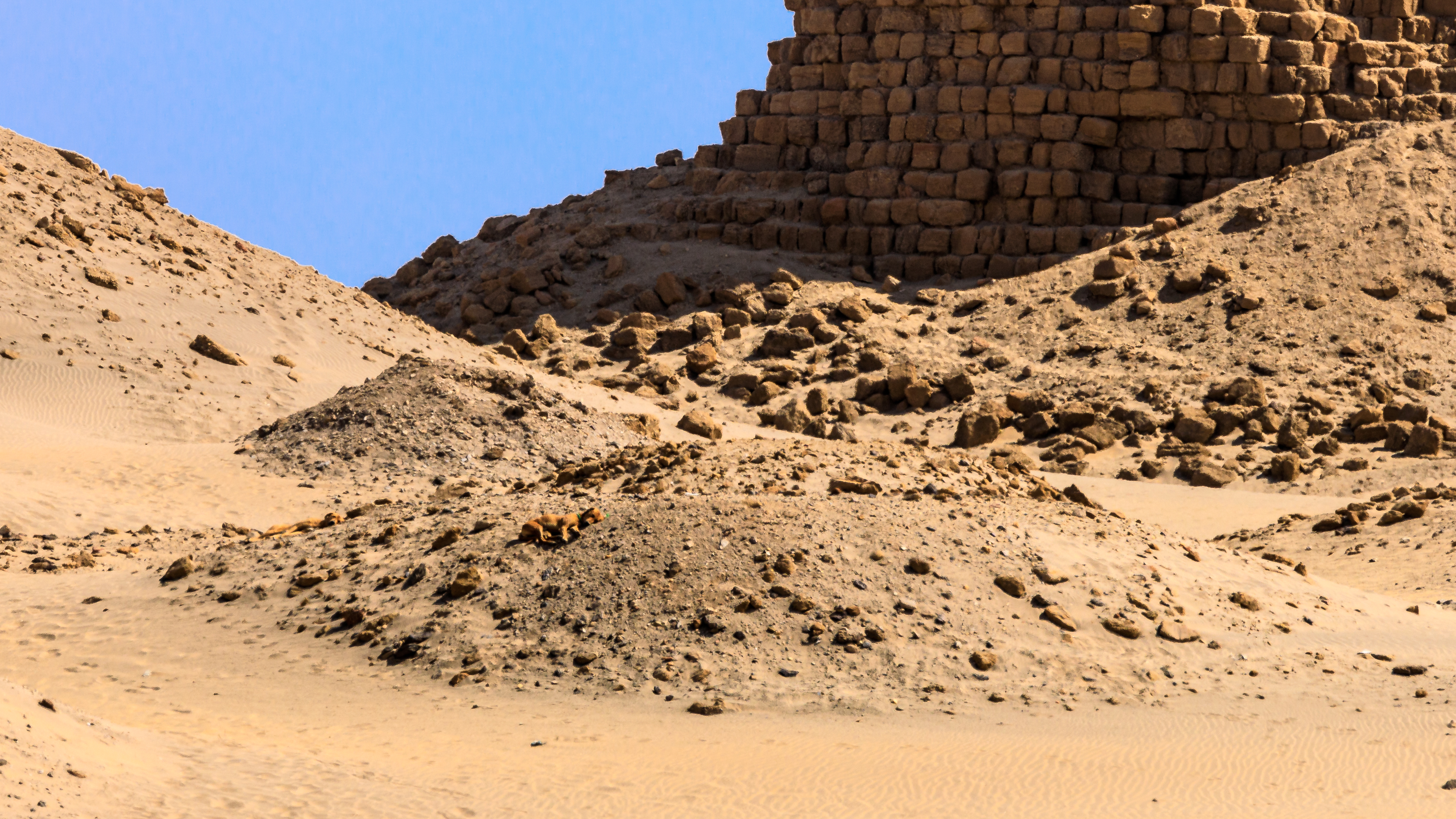
Closeup of the ruins of Nuri pyramid 20 of Atlanersa (foreground) and the pyramid of Amaniastabarqa (background)

Following excavations at the necropolis of Nuri, Reisner proposed to attribute the pyramid Nuri 20 to Atlanersa on chronological grounds. Nuri 20 is the second-oldest pyramid of the necropolis after that of Taharqa and did not belong to Senkamanisken, whose pyramid Nuri 3 was built subsequently. Reisner's arguments have been broadly accepted. (Note: Reisner's arguments have last been reviewed by Dunham and Macadam, who share Reisner's conclusion. All subsequent scholars, including Török, have stated that Nuri 20 belongs to Atlanersa without further discussion.) Atlanersa was the second king, following Taharqa, to choose Nuri for burial; this fact motivates certain specialists—including Török, Timothy Kendall and El-Hassan Ahmed Mohamed—to posit that Atlanersa was Taharqa's son, and that he chose this necropolis to be close to and honor his father.

The pyramid is made of sandstone masonry, with a steep slope at 66° and a surface area of c. 12.09 m^{2} (130.1 sq ft). The pyramid complex is surrounded by a sandstone enclosure and comprises a small chapel adjacent to the pyramid eastern side. At its center, the chapel housed an offering stand on which was an offering table, both of grey granite. The table was originally inscribed with reliefs and hieroglyphs, now illegible.

The pyramid substructures were accessed from a stair of 36 steps, starting at ground level east of the chapel. At the end of the staircase was a wall of masonry meant to bar thieves from entering the tomb, which comprised two chambers. The antechamber is 2.6 m × 2.5 m (8.5 ft × 8.2 ft) in size, while the burial chamber is larger at 5.65 m × 3.75 m (18.5 ft × 12.3 ft). The latter contained a lid and several fragments of canopic jars, 11 or 12 canopic clay figures of gods and goddesses including Osiris, Imsety and Neith, a few inlay pieces of lapis lazuli, obsidian and slate (all originally from a sarcophagus), and fragmentary faience shawabtis.

Excavations of the pyramid yielded numerous objects including fragments of jars and alabaster vessels, one of which was inscribed with Tantamani's cartouches, several bowls, a beryl scarab attached to a gold wire loop, pieces of gold foil, a faience pendant with Atlanersa's cartouche, Menat amulets and beads, pieces of paste, and further fragments of shawabtis. In total, 15 complete shawabtis were recovered of over 235 found in the pyramid, all c. 15 cm (5.9 in) in size. Many of these objects are now on display at the Boston Museum of Fine Arts.

A nearby rectangular building of brown sandstone, now known as Nuri 500, may have been a funerary chapel. It yielded an alabaster votive tablet bearing Atlanersa's cartouche.

== Political situation ==
=== Chronology ===
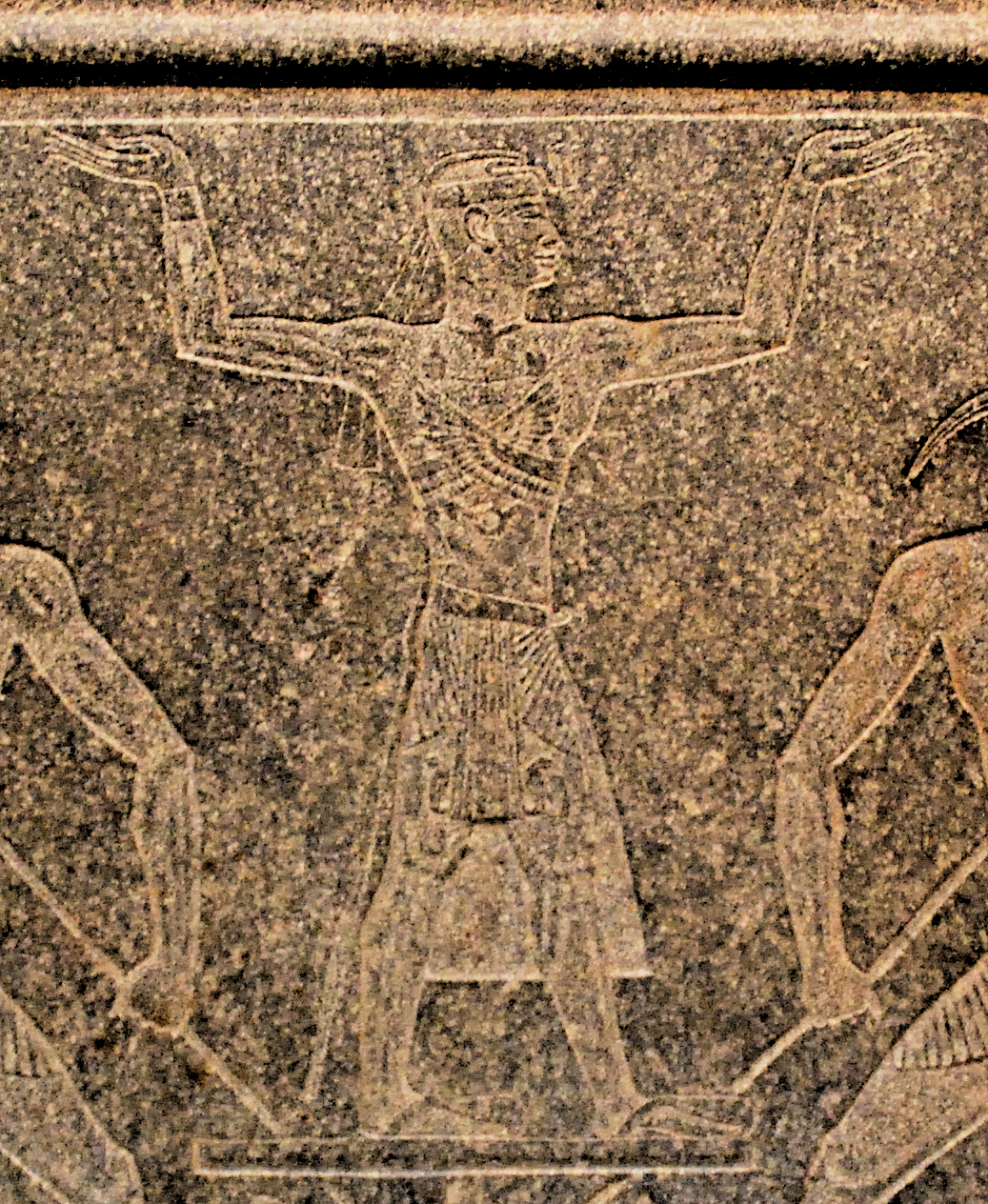
Atlanersa holding up the heavens, on a stand for a boat shrine of Amun-Re

Atlanersa might have been born around 671 BC or shortly after, when Taharqa's heir apparent Nes-Anhuret was captured in Memphis by Esarhaddon. Atlanersa reigned for a decade in the mid-7th century BC, ascending to the throne around 653 BC and dying around 643 BC, a period of Nubian history now called the early Napatan period. This makes him a contemporary of Ashurbanipal (fl. c. 668–627 BC) and Psamtik I (fl. c. 664–610 BC).

=== Collapse of the 25th Dynasty ===
By the end of Taharqa's reign, the 25th Dynasty state was in crisis, on the losing side of a war against the Neo-Assyrian Empire. From c. 665–664 BC, Taharqa and Tantamani had lost control of Lower Egypt, which came under the power of Assyrian vassals (Note: Scholars working on this time period use the word "vassal" to describe local rulers designated by more powerful kings to reign in their stead over a region or locality. Vassals of the Assyrian emperor such as Necho I were expected to pay tribute to the king and rally troops with the Assyrians as necessary.) including Necho I and his son in Sais, the future great pharaoh Psamtik I. In 663 BC, Tantamani managed a short-lived reconquest of Memphis, killing Necho I in the process, but was beaten during the ensuing campaign by Ashurbanipal, which finished with the sack of Thebes that same year. Weakened, the Kushites could not resist the subsequent rise of the Twenty-sixth Dynasty of Egypt under the impulse of Psamtik I, who proceeded south quickly during the remainder of Tantamani's reign, definitively expelling him from Upper Egypt c. 656 BC. Thus, in contrast to his predecessors, Atlanersa's kingdom was restricted to the region of Kush, south of Elephantine, and its seat of power was Napata. The Kushites would nonetheless continue to wield a significant influence in the Theban region of Upper Egypt where an aristocracy of Nubian descent had established itself in the 8th century BC, in particular amongst the high clergy of Amun.

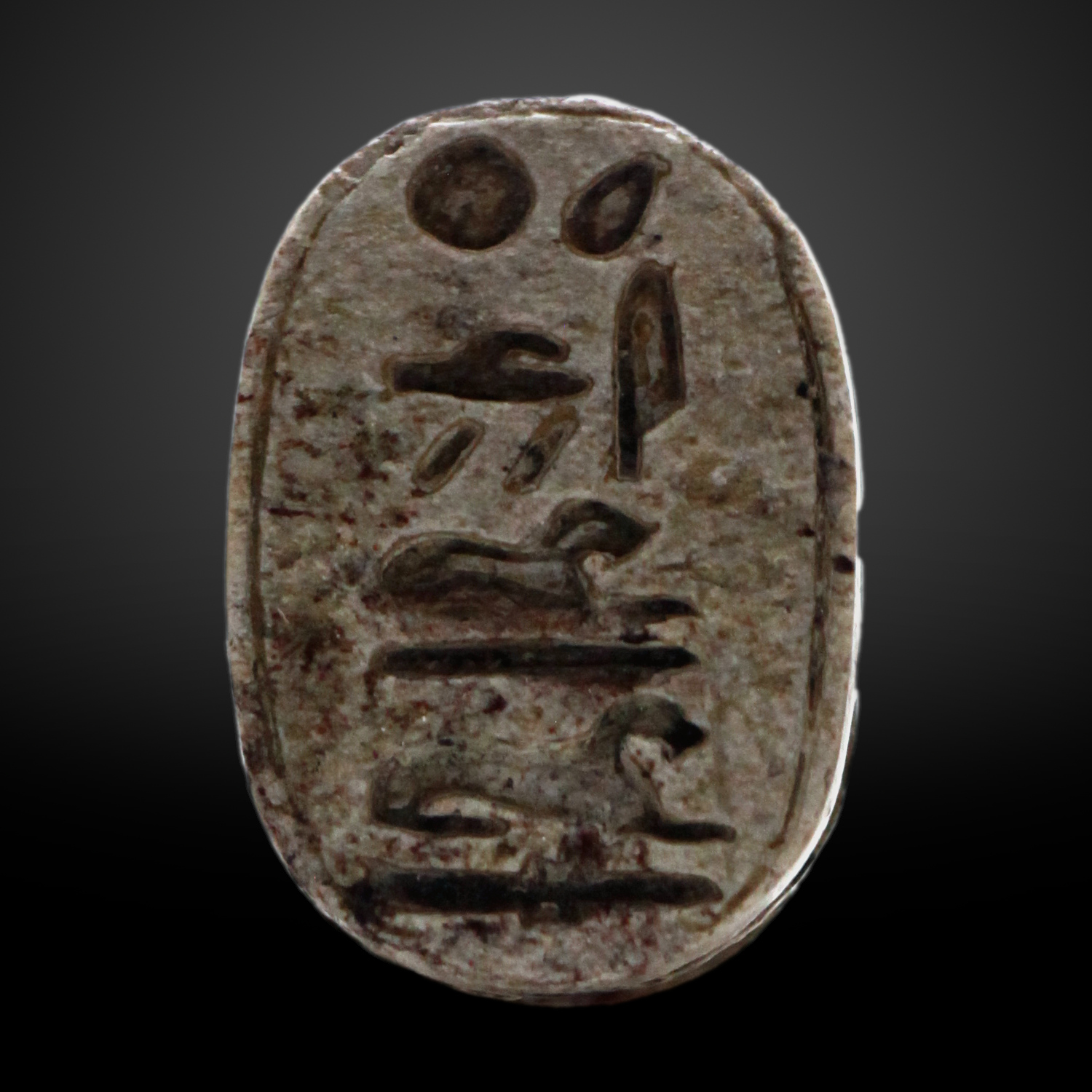
Scarab of Atlanersa from his pyramid in Nuri, now in the Louvre Museum, Paris

Despite these developments, Atlanersa adopted the fivefold titulary in the style of Egyptian pharaohs; gave himself the epithets of "Son of Ra" and "King of Upper and Lower Egypt" in his inscriptions; and had the gods promise him lordship over Egypt in exchange for Temple B700. While Atlanersa's Horus name, "Founder of the two lands", is identical with that of the much earlier king of the 13th Dynasty, Neferhotep I, Török proposes that it is rather based on the titles of Theban kings of the Third Intermediate Period. For example, starting with the High-priest of Amun Herihor (fl. c. 1080 BC), a number of rulers of the 21st and 22nd Dynasties were called "son of Amun whom he placed on his throne to be founder of the Two Lands", a prominent example being Osorkon I (fl. c. 900 BC). In the same vein, Atlanersa's nebty name of "Mery Maat" was also borne by the kings Siamun (fl. c. 970 BC), Osorkon II (fl. c. 850 BC) and Shoshenq III (fl. c. 810 BC).

Serge Sauneron and Jean Yoyotte proposed that either Atlanersa or Senkamanisken faced an incursion of Egyptian troops under the command of Psamtik I, who very probably also established a garrison on Elephantine to guard the border. This hypothesis is contested by Török, who points to the lack of direct evidence. In any case, a raid on Napata by the Egyptians did take place during the later reign of Psamtik II c. 593 BC. During this raid, the colossal statue of Atlanersa in front of Temple B700 was toppled and its head cut off.

== See also ==
- List of monarchs of Kush

== Sources ==
- "Atlanersa on the website of the Museum of Fine Arts". Museum of Fine Arts, Boston.
- Baikie, James (2018). Revival: Egyptian antiquities in the Nile valley (1932): a descriptive handbook. Routledge Revivals. Boca Raton, Florida: Taylor and Francis. ISBN 9781351344074.
- "Boat stand of King Atlanersa". Museum of Fine Arts, Boston. "accession number 23.728b"
- "Cartouche pendant of Atlanersa". Museum of Fine Arts, Boston. "accession number 24.1065"
- Dafa'alla, Samia (1993). "Succession in the Kingdom of Napata, 900–300 B.C.". The International Journal of African Historical Studies. 26 (1): 167–174. doi:10.2307/219190. JSTOR 219190.
- de Meulenaere, Herman (1951). Herodotos over de 26ste Dynastie (II, 147–III, 15). Bijdrage tot het historisch-kritisch onderzoek van Herodotos' gegevens in het licht van de Egyptische en contemporaire bronnen (in Dutch). Louvain: Institut Orientaliste. OCLC 256187613.
- Dodson, Aidan (2002). "The Problem of Amenirdis II and the Heirs to the Office of God's Wife of Amun during the Twenty-Sixth Dynasty". The Journal of Egyptian Archaeology. 88: 179–186. doi:10.1177/030751330208800112. JSTOR 3822343. S2CID 190737173.
- Dodson, Aidan; Hilton, Dyan (2004). The Complete Royal Families of Ancient Egypt. London: Thames & Hudson Ltd. ISBN 978-0-500-05128-3.
- Dunham, Dows (1947). "Four Kushite Colossi in the Sudan". The Journal of Egyptian Archaeology. 33: 63–65. doi:10.1177/030751334703300109. JSTOR 3855440. S2CID 194077101.
- Dunham, Dows; Macadam, Laming (1949). "Names and Relationships of the Royal Family of Napata". The Journal of Egyptian Archaeology. 35: 139–149. doi:10.1177/030751334903500124. JSTOR 3855222. S2CID 192423817.
- Dunham, Dows (1955). The Royal Cemeteries of Kush. Volume II Nuri. Boston, Massachusetts: Museum of Fine Arts. OCLC 265463334.
- Eide, Tormod; Hægg, Tomas; Pierce, Richard Holton; Török, Laszlo (1994). Fontes historiae Nubiorum. Textual Sources for the History of the Middle Nile Region Between the Eighth Century BC and the Sixth Century AD. Vol 1. From the Eighth to the Mid-Fifth Century BC. Bergen: University of Bergen, Department of Classics. ISBN 82-991411-6-8.
- "Fragments of the bark stand of King Atlanersa". Museum of Fine Arts, Boston. "accession number 23.728b"
- "Fragments of paste". Museum of Fine Arts, Boston. "accession number 17-2-134"
- Griffith, Francis Llewellyn (1929). "Scenes from a Destroyed Temple at Napata". The Journal of Egyptian Archaeology. 15 (1): 26–28. doi:10.1177/030751332901500104. JSTOR 3854010. S2CID 192376194.
- "Head of the god Imsety from canopic jar of King Atlanersa". Museum of Fine Arts, Boston. "accession number 20.1066"
- "Inscribed votive tablet". Museum of Fine Arts, Boston. "accession number 20.765"
- Kahn, Dan'el (2006). "The Assyrian Invasions of Egypt (673–663 B.C.) and the Final Expulsion of the Kushites". Studien zur Altägyptischen Kultur. 34: 251–267. JSTOR 25157757.
- Kendall, Timothy (1990). "Discoveries at Sudan's Sacred Mountain of Jebel Barkal Reveal Secrets of the Kingdom of Kush". National Geographic. 178 (5). National Geographic Society: 96–124.
- Kendall, Timothy; Ahmed Mohamed, El-Hassan (2016). "A Visitor's Guide to The Jebel Barkal Temples" (PDF). The NCAM Jebel Barkal Mission. Khartoum: Sudan. Nubian Archeological Development Organization (Qatar-Sudan). Archived from the original (PDF) on 14 December 2017.
- Kitchen, Kenneth A. (1986). The Third Intermediate Period in Egypt (1100–650 B.C.) (2nd ed.). Warminster: Aris & Phillips LTD. OCLC 751458775.
- Lobban, Richard (2004). Historical Dictionary of Ancient and Medieval Nubia. Historical Dictionaries of Ancient Civilizations and Historical Eras. Vol. 10. Lanham, Md.: Scarecrow Press. ISBN 9780810865785.
- "Menat amulet". Museum of Fine Arts, Boston. "accession number 20.1102a-b"
- "Menat amulet". Museum of Fine Arts, Boston. "accession number 20.1099"
- Morkot, Robert (1999). "Kingship and Kinship in the Empire of Kush". In Wenig, Steffen (ed.). Studien zum antiken Sudan. meroitica. Vol. 15. Wiesbaden: Harrassowitz Verlag. pp. 179–229. ISBN 3447041390.
- "Napata. Capital of ancient Kush kingdom". Encyclopedia Britannica.
- Pope, Jeremy (2014). The Double Kingdom Under Taharqo: Studies in the History of Kush and Egypt c. 690–664 BC. Leiden: Brill. ISBN 978-90-04-26295-9.
- Porter, Bertha; Moss, Rosalind (1952). Topographical Bibliography of Ancient Egyptian Hieroglyphic Texts, Reliefs, and Paintings VII. Nubia. The Deserts and Outside Egypt. Oxford: Clarendon Press. OCLC 459577709.
- Reisner, George Andrew (1918). "Preliminary Report on the Harvard-Boston excavation at Nûri: the kings of Ethiopia after Tirhaqa". In Bates, Oric (ed.). Varia Africana II. Vol. 2. Cambridge, Mass.: Harvard University Press. OCLC 941042965.
- Reisner, George Andrew (1925). "Excavations in Egypt and Ethiopia 1922–1925" (PDF). Museum of Fine Arts Bulletin. XXIII (137). Boston, Massachusetts: Museum of Fine Arts: 17–29.
- "Ring beads". Museum of Fine Arts, Boston. "accession number 17-1-932"
- Sauneron, Serge; Yoyotte, Jean (1952). "La campagne nubienne de Psammétique II et sa signification historique [avec 4 planches et une carte]". Bulletin de l'Institut Français d'Archéologie Orientale (in French). 50: 157–207.
- "Finger ring with scarab". Museum of Fine Arts, Boston. "accession number 20.259"
- "Shawabty of King Atlanersa". Museum of Fine Arts, Boston. "accession number 21.14423"
- "Shawabty of King Atlanersa". Museum of Fine Arts, Boston. "accession number 21.3128"
- "Shawabty of King Atlanersa". Museum of Fine Arts, Boston. "accession number 21.3130"
- Shinnie, P. L. (2008). "The Nilotic Sudan and Ethiopia". In Fage, F. D. (ed.). The Cambridge history of Africa. Volume 2. From c. 500 BC to AD 1050. Cambridge University Press. pp. 210–271. OCLC 781990483.
- Terrace, Edward Lee Bockman (1959). "Three Egyptian Bronzes". Bulletin. Museum of Fine Arts Boston. LVII (308): 48–55. JSTOR 4171303.
- "The kingdom of Kush". Encyclopedia Britannica.
- Török, László (1997). The Kingdom of Kush. Handbook of the Napatan-Meroitic Civilization. Handbuch der Orientalistik. Abteilung 1. Nahe und Mittlere Osten. Leiden: E.J. Brill. ISBN 9789004104488.
- Török, László (2002). The Image of the Ordered World in Ancient Nubian Art: The Construction of the Kushite Mind, 800 BC–300 AD. Probleme der Ägyptologie. Vol. 18. Leiden: Brill. ISBN 9789004123069.
- von Beckerath, Jürgen (1997). Handbuch der Ägyptischen Königsnamen. Mainz: Von Zabern. pp. 268–269. ISBN 3-8053-2591-6.
- von Beckerath, Jürgen (1999). Chronologie des pharaonischen Ägypten : die Zeitbestimmung der ägyptischen Geschichte von der Vorzeit bis 332 v. Chr. Münchner ägyptologische Studien (in German). Vol. 46. Mainz am Rhein: Philipp von Zabern. ISBN 978-3-8053-2310-9.
- Zibelius-Chen, Karola (2012). "II. 12. The Chronology of Nubian Kingdoms from Dyn. 25 to the end of the Kingdom of Meroe". In Hornung, Erik; Krauss, Rolf; Warburton, David (eds.). Ancient Egyptian Chronology. Handbook of Oriental Studies. Leiden, Boston: Brill. pp. 284–303. ISBN 978-90-04-11385-5. ISSN 0169-9423.

Preceded by Tantamani	Rulers of Kush	Succeeded by Senkamanisken
