= Yeturow =

Nubian queen

- Queen of Kush

Queen consort
- Burial: 7th century BC; Nuri (tomb Nu 53)
- Spouse: Atlanersa
- Dynasty: 25th Dynasty of Egypt / Napatan period
- Father: Taharqa
- Religion: Ancient Kushite/Egyptian religion

ir r w Z2 iry
Yeturow
in hieroglyphs
Era: Kingdom of Kush
(780 BC–350 AD)

Yeturow (Iretiru) was a Nubian queen with the Egyptian titles king's wife, king's wife of the people of Egypt, king's daughter and king's sister. Her father was most likely king Taharqa. Her royal husband was her brother Atlanersa.

Yeturow is known from her burial at Nuri (Nu 53). Her tomb was found heavily destroyed. There was once perhaps a pyramid with a chapel but no remains of those were found. The underground parts of the tomb were better preserved. There is a staircase going down to the burial chamber that was found looted. There were found paintings on the wall, showing Yeturow in front of the Underwolrd god Osiris. Here are preserved her name and titles. Her heart scarab was discovered near another tomb (Nu. 74). Furthermore, there were still fragments of at least 389 shabtis, all without inscriptions. Within the burial chamber were also found decorated ivory fragments, most likely once inlays for other objects Yeturow was perhaps also shown together with other royal women on a pylon at Jebel Barkal. The pylon is now destroyed but the depictions are known from older drawings. The 19th century of the depictions are not very clear, so that there remains an uncertainty whether Yeturow is shown there.
