= Henuttakhebit =

Nubian queen

Henuttakhebit was a Nubian queen with the Egyptian titles king's wife, king's daughter and king's sister. Her royal husband is not known for sure. Perhaps she was the wife of Aspelta and daughter of Senkamanisken, as proposed by Dows Dunham and M. F. Laming Macadam. This is not certain. She was the daughter or adopted daughter of queen Madiqen and followed her as songstress of Amun in Napata.

Henuttakhebit is known from her burial at Nuri (Nu. 28) and from a stela that describes her adoption. Her burial consisted of a pyramid with a small chapel in front of it. There is a staircase going down to the two burial chambers that were found looted. The burial still contained plaques, providing her name. There are several shabtis found in different parts of the cemetery providing her name, none of them were found in this tomb. Three come from tomb Nu. 25, where also other shabtis from other queens were found. Here she just bears the king's wife.
