= Masalaye =

Nubian royal lady

Masalaye was a Nubian royal lady known only from her burial at Nuri (Nu. 23). Her burial consisted of a pyramid (about 10 m in square), a chapel in front of the pyramid and of tow burial chambers under the pyramid, that were reached via a staircase. The burial chamber was found heavily looted, but still contained at least 50 shabti figures that provide her name. Several shabtis of queen Nasala were found too, that might have come into the tomb due to the general looting of the whole cemetery. Masalaye does not bear any title. Her name is written within a cartouche indicating a royal status. It had been proposed that she was the wife of Senkamanisken.
