= Senkamanisken =

Kushite King

- Senkamanisken
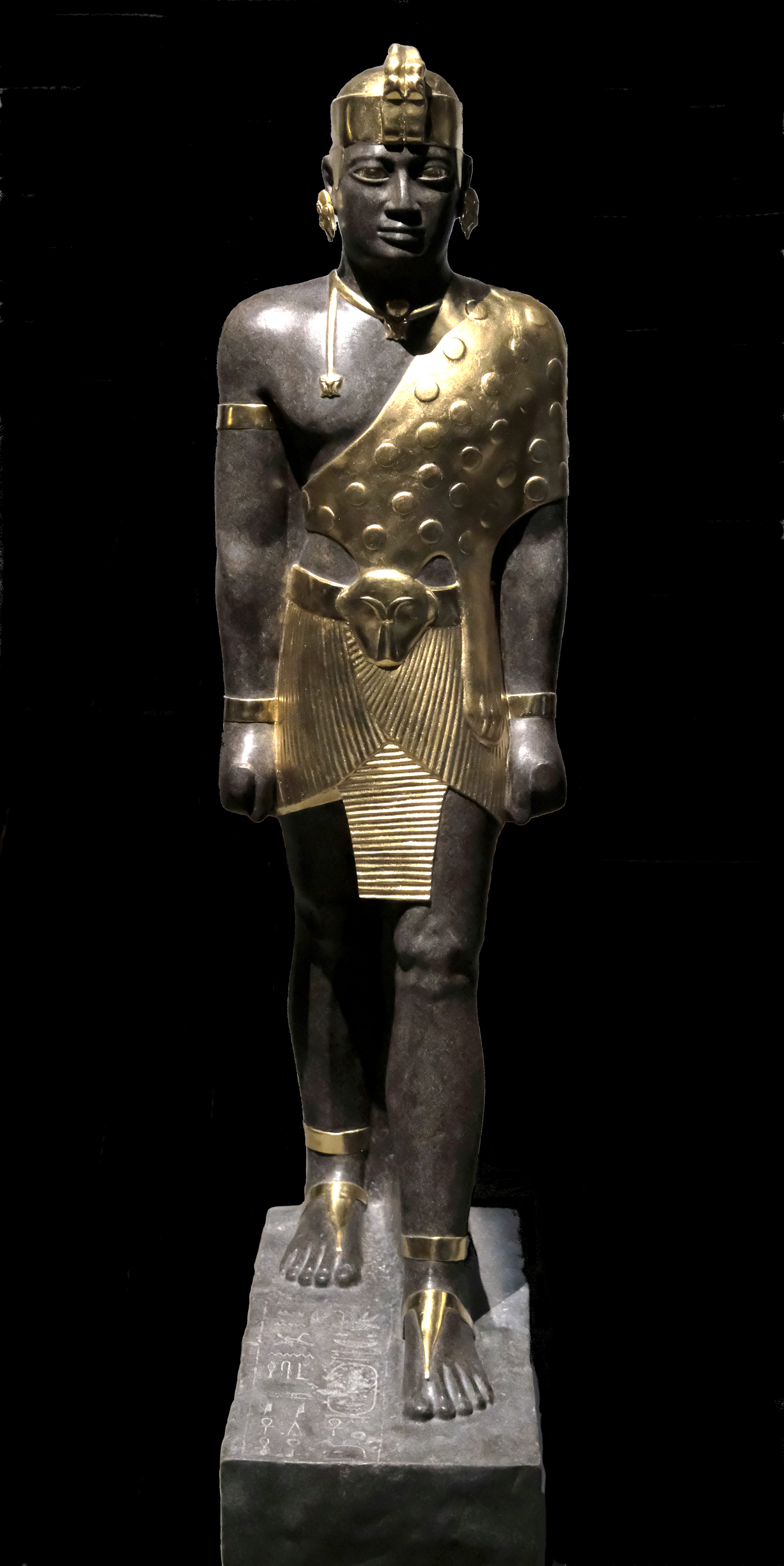
- Senkamanisken statue, with Kushite headress (Louvre Museum, reconstruction of original colors through color-pigment analysis).

Kushite king of Napata
- Reign: c. 640–620 BC
- Predecessor: Atlanersa
- Successor: Anlamani
Royal titulary
Horus name
Seh(er)tawy
Pacifier (?) of the Two Lands
Nebty name
Khahermaat
Who appears in Equity
Golden Horus
Userpehty
Whose strength is mighty
Prenomen
Sekheperenre
He who Ra has raised

M23 X1 L2 X1	N5 s xpr
Nomen
Senkamanisken

G39 N5	z n E1 i mn n z k n
- Consorts: Nasalsa, Amanimalel, Masalaye ?
- Children: Anlamani, Aspelta, Queen Henuttakhebit?, Queen Madiqen?
- Father: Atlanersa ?
- Mother: Queen Maletaral
- Burial: Nuri (Nu. 3)

Senkamanisken was a Kushite King who ruled from 640 to 620 BC at Napata. He used royal titles based on those of the ancient Egyptian pharaohs.

== Biography ==
He might have been married to queens Amanimalel and Nasalsa, the latter of whom bore him two sons: Anlamani and Aspelta. Both sons would ultimately assume the Kushite throne after his death at Napata, Nubia's capital city. His pyramid is Nu.3 in Nuri.

Statues of Senkamanisken have been found buried or hidden in the Jebel Barkal, presumably due to Psamtik II's attack on Kush in 592 BC. A sphinx has also been found which was inscribed with his name. Objects bearing the name of this king have also been found in Meroë indicating that he placed a degree of importance to this site which would be the political capital of the Kushite kingdom after Psamtik II's sack of Napata in 592 BC.

He is the only Nubian king after the 25th Dynasty known from an inscription found in Egypt. He appears on a fragment of an offering table from Memphis.

== Artifacts ==
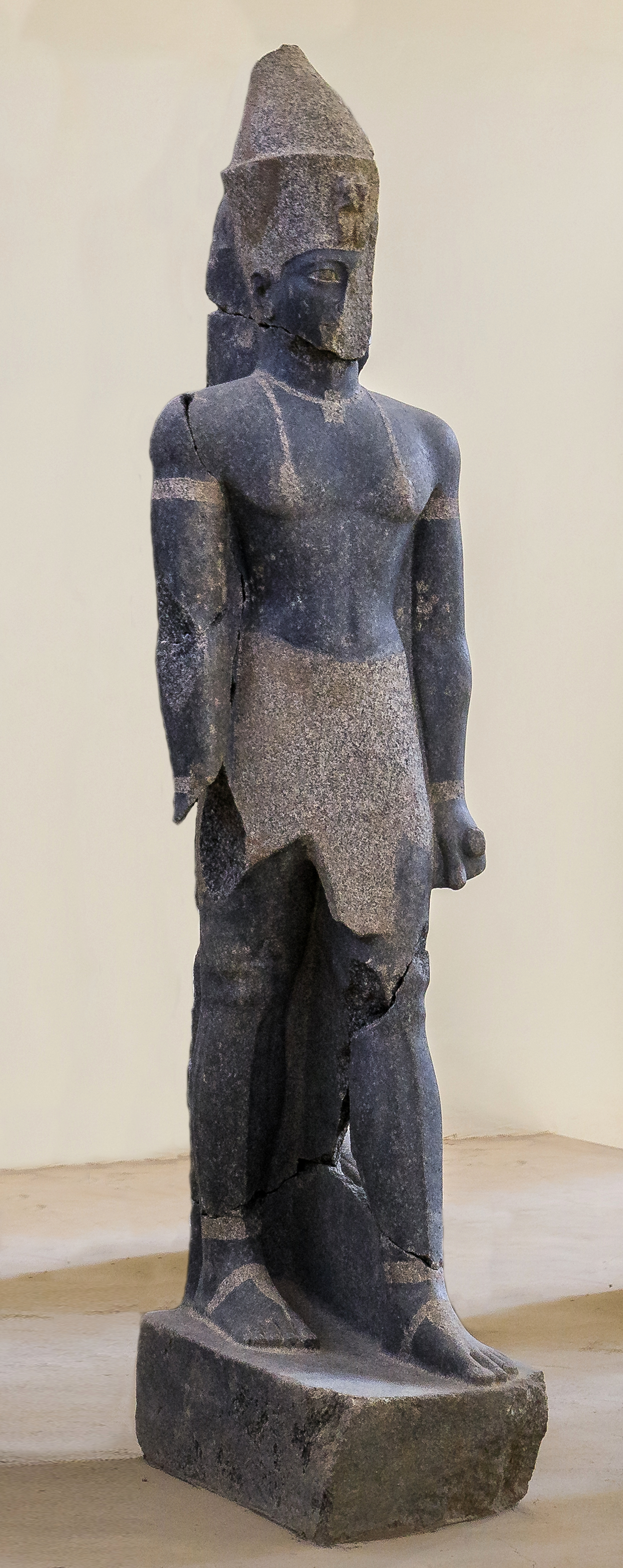
Senkamanisken statue, Kerma Museum

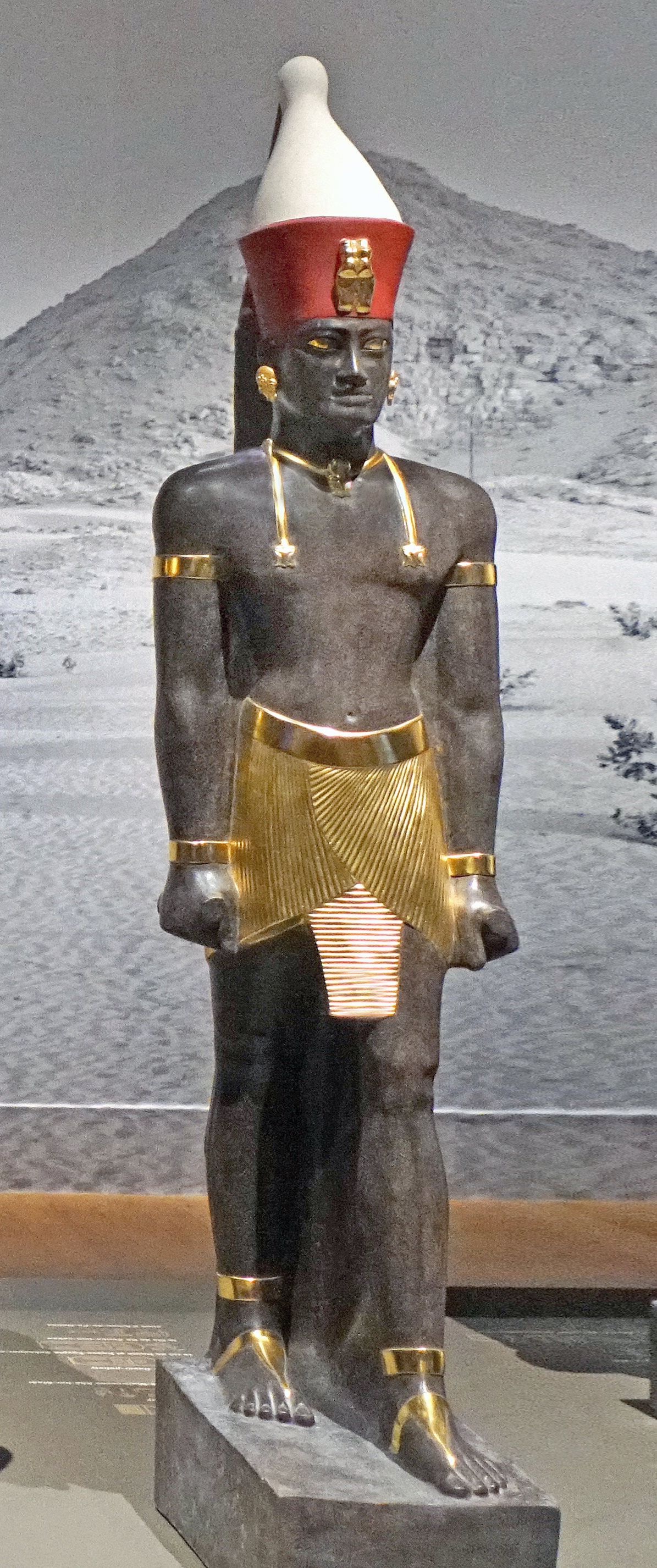
Senkamanisken, Louvre Museum reconstruction, with pharaonic headdress.

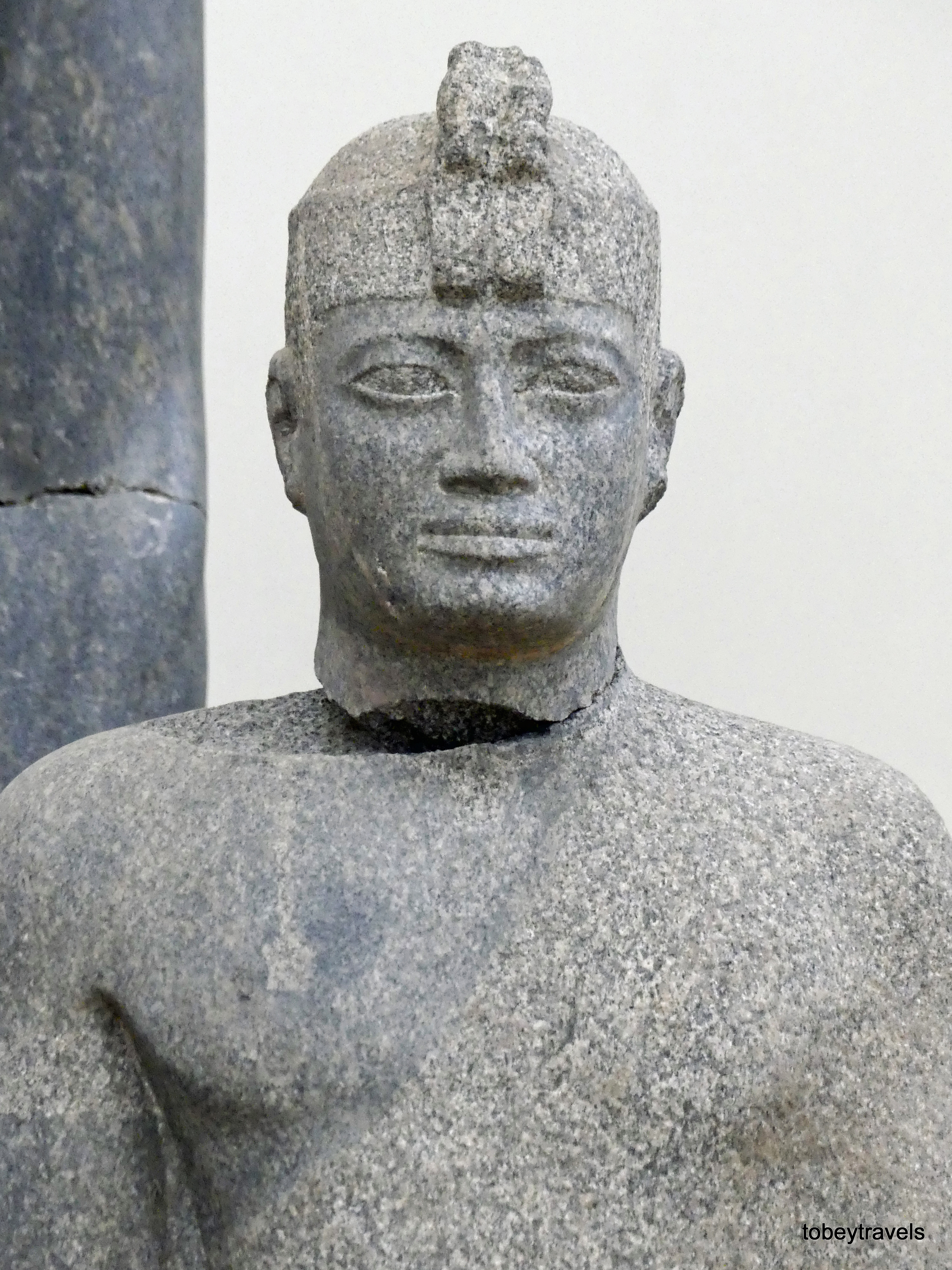
Senkamanisken portrait in the Kerma Museum

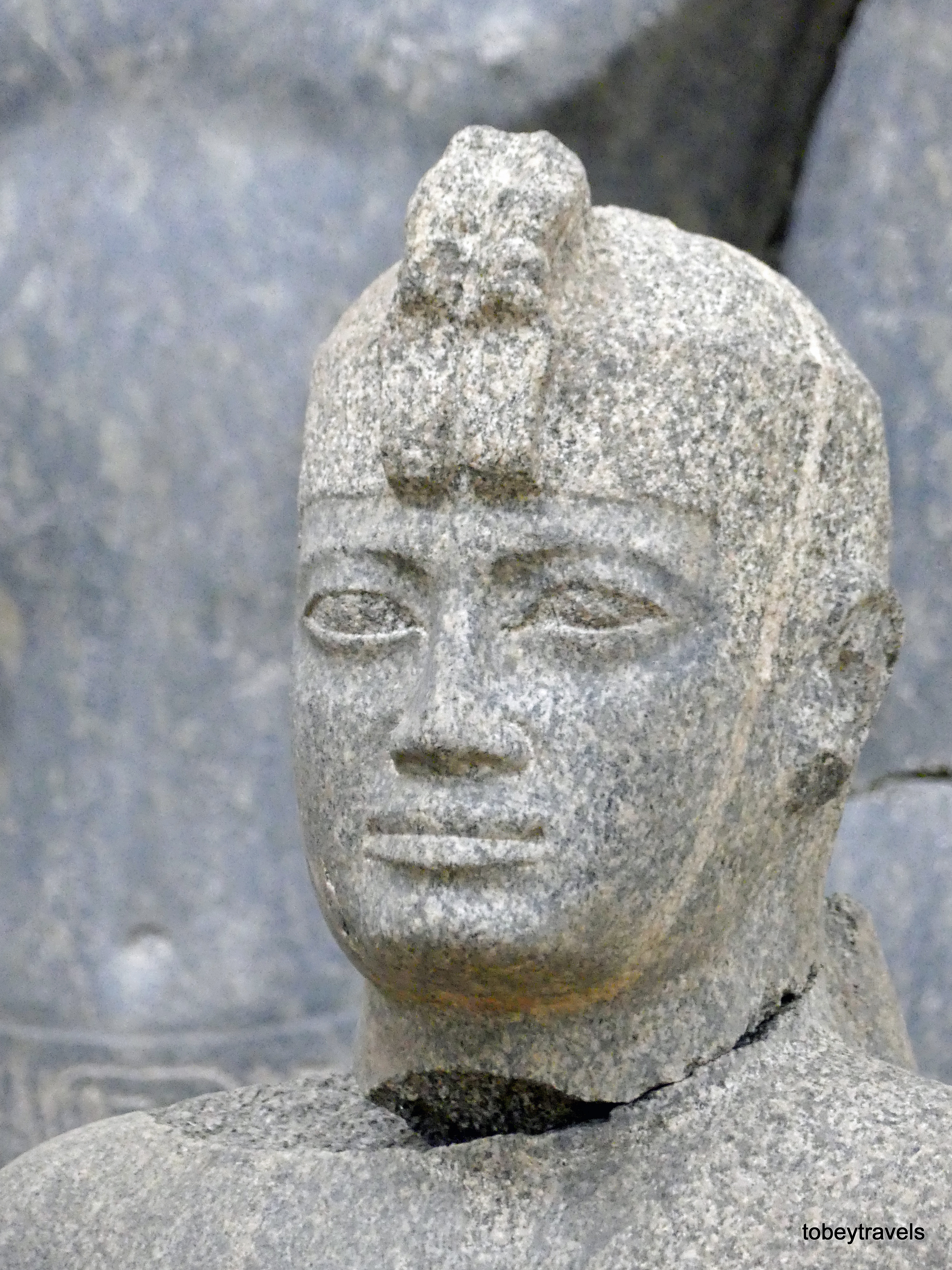
Senkamanisken portrait in the Kerma Museum

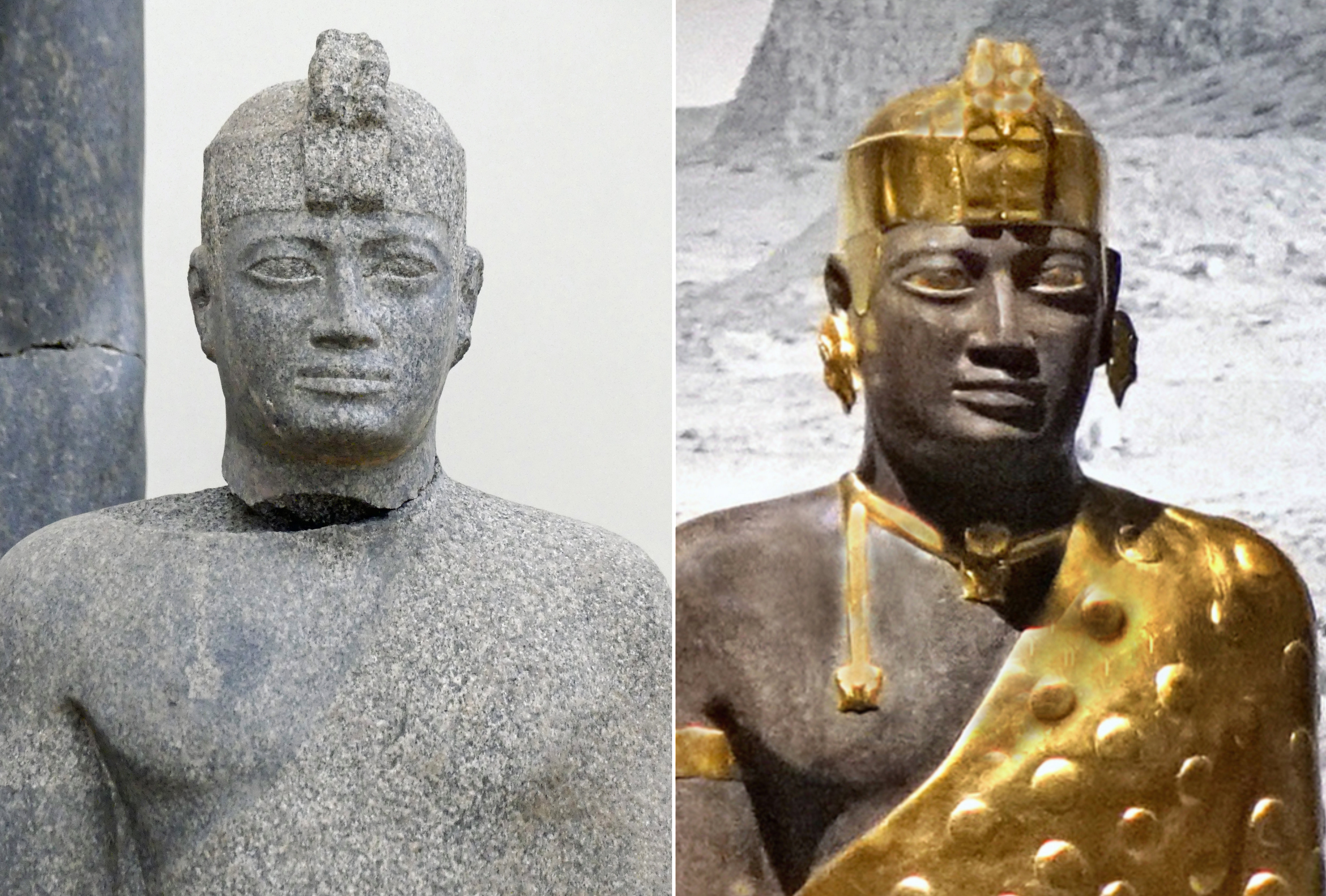
Senkamanisken, original in Kerma Museum, and Louvre Museum reconstruction through color-pigment analysis

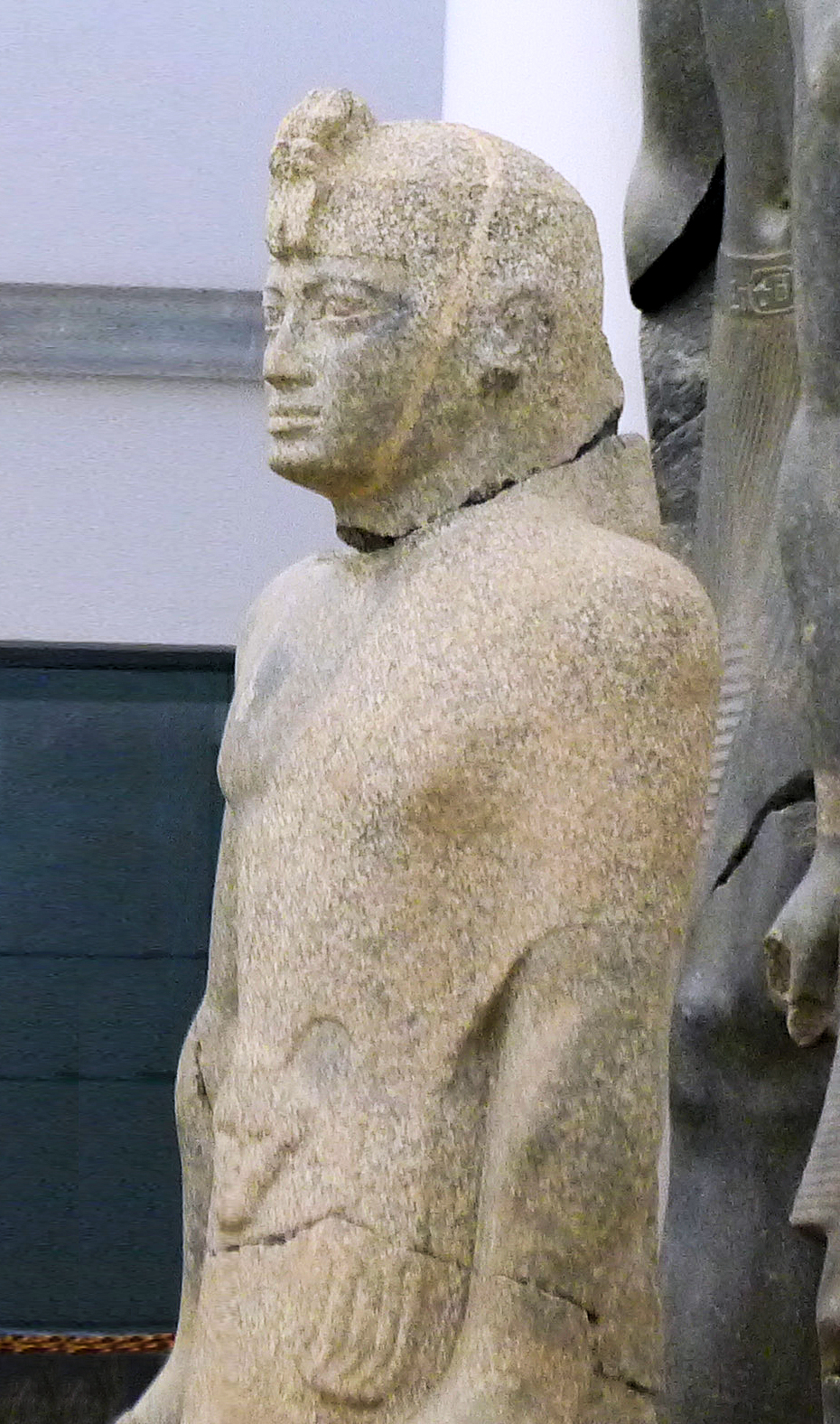
Senkamanisken, wearing the skin of a feline over his torso, Kerma Museum

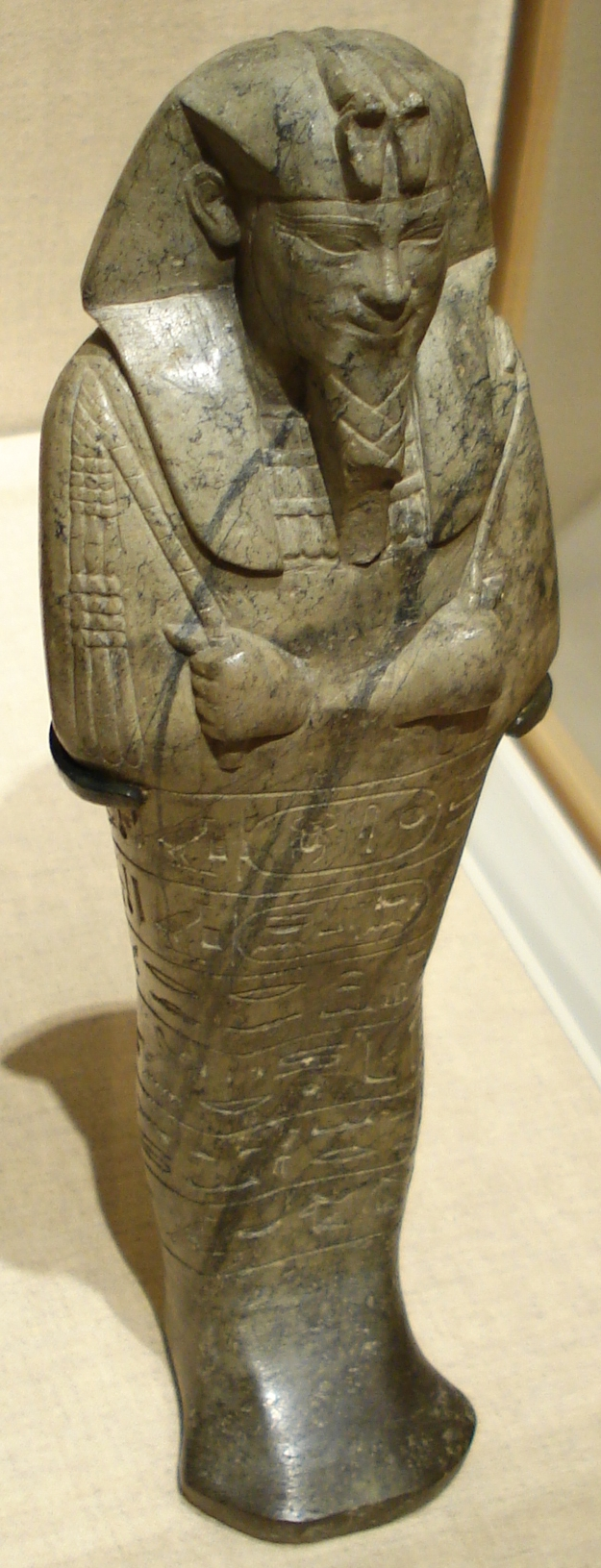
An ushabti figurine of Senkamanisken, found in his tomb at Nuri

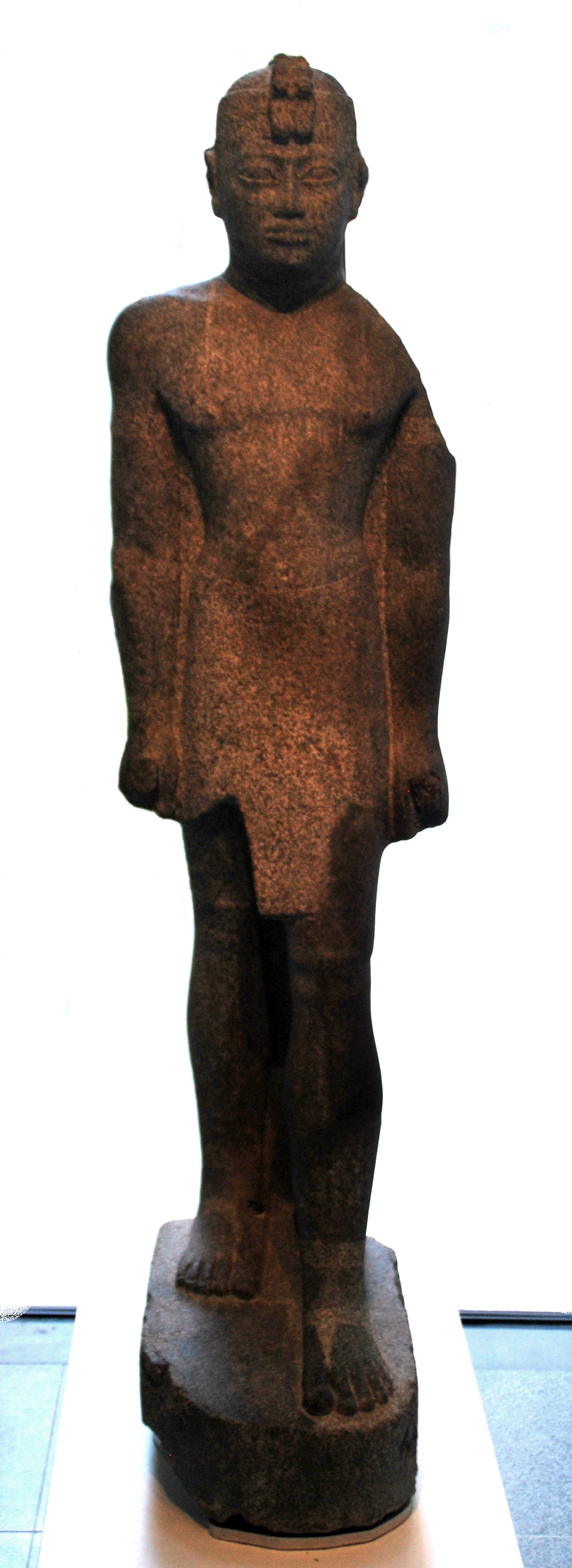
Statue of King Senkamanisken, Boston Museum of Fine Arts

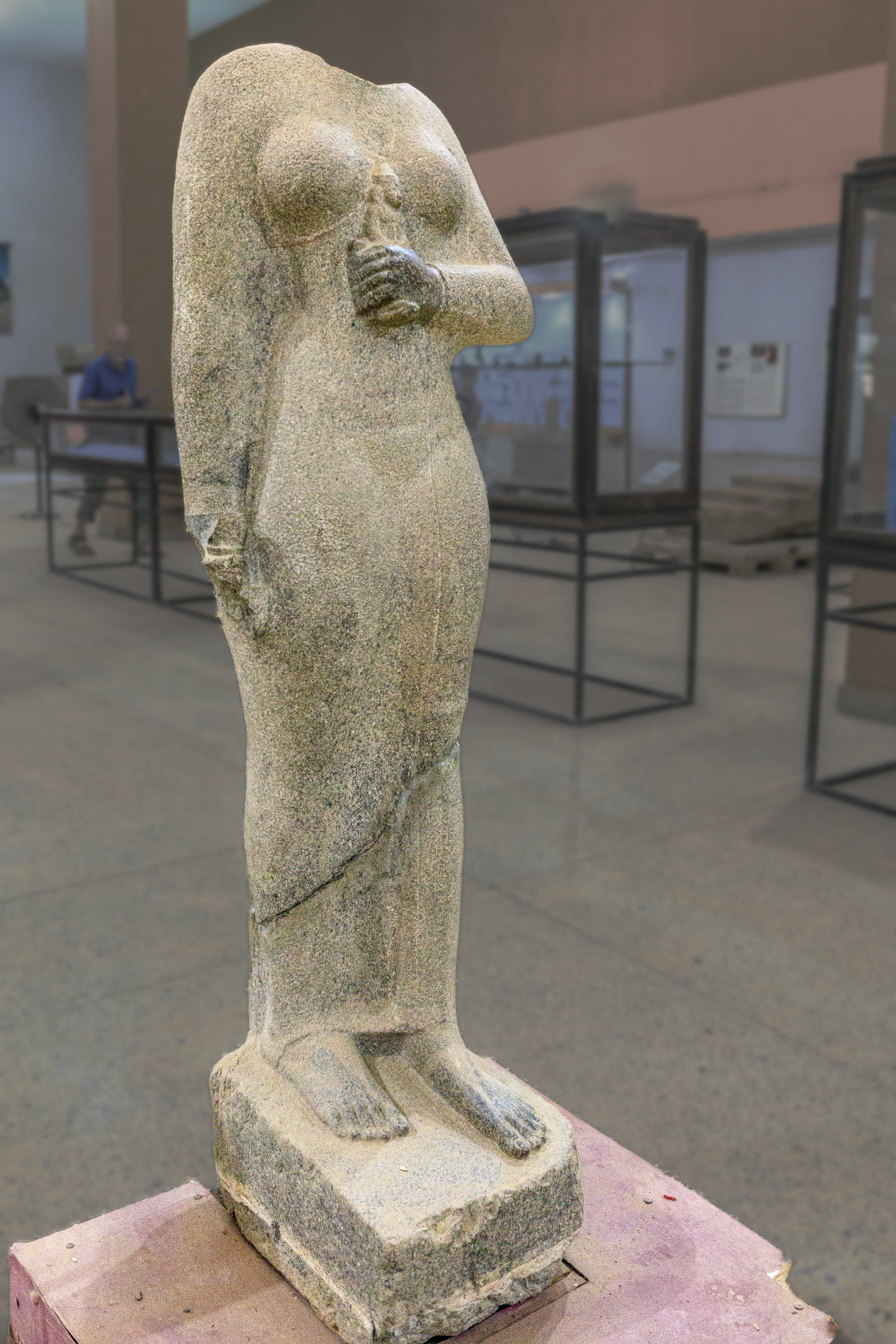
Queen Amanimalil, possible consort of Senkamanisken

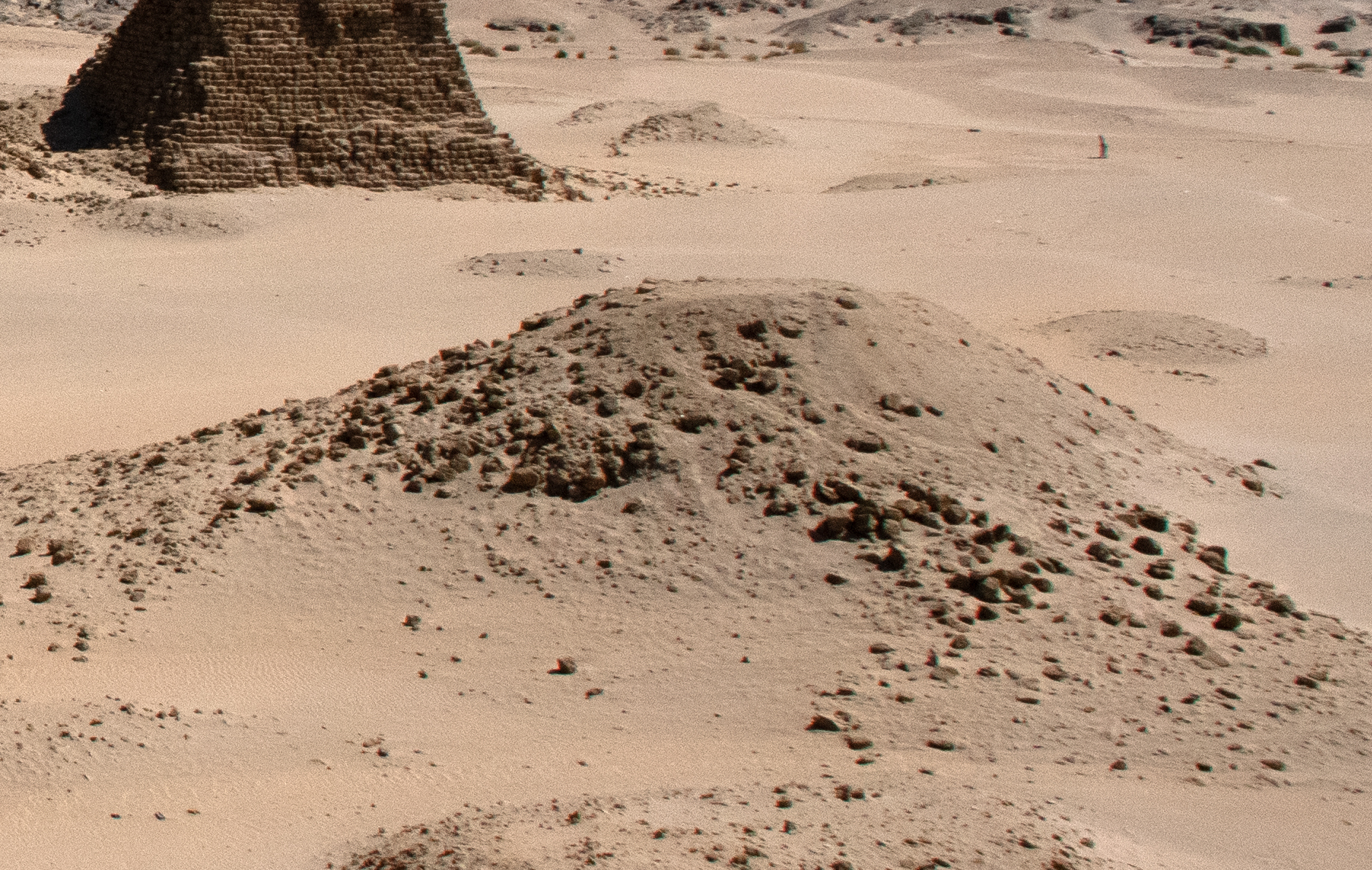
Ruins of the pyramid of Senkamisken at Nuri

=== Temple B700 at Jebel Barkal ===
He also decorated Temple B700 (started by Aspelta) at Jebel Barkal, where he is shown clubbing enemies.

The hieroglyphic inscription on the Temple described the role of God Amun in selecting Senkamanisken as king:

I said of you (while you were still) in your mother's womb that you were to be ruler of Kemet ("Black Land"= Egypt). I knew you in the semen, while you were in the egg, that you were to be lord. I made you receive the Great Crown, which Re (the Sun god) caused to appear on the first good occasion. (Inasmuch as) a father makes his son excellent, it is I who decreed kingship) to you. (So) who shall share it with you? For I am the Lord of Heaven. As I give to Re, (so) he gives to his children, from gods to men. It is I who gives you the royal charter.... No other (can) decree (who is to be) king. It is I who grants kingship to whomever I will.

— Amun inscription, frieze of Senkamanisken, Temple B700, Jebel Barkal.

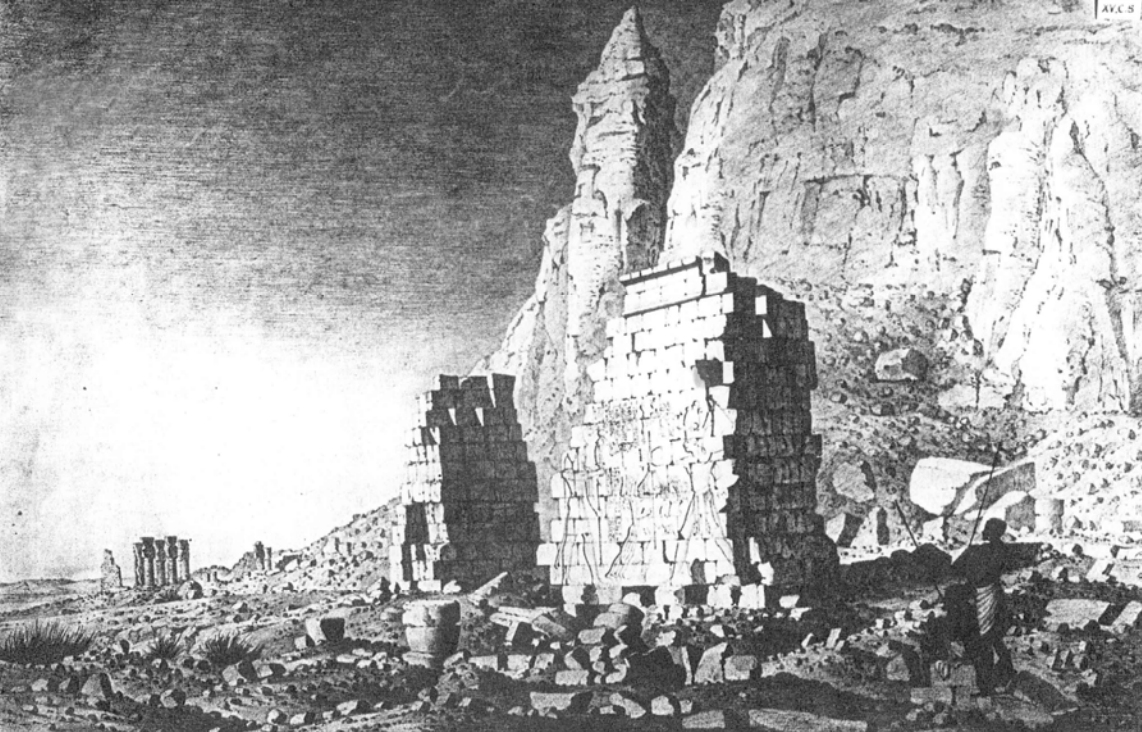
Ruins of Temple B700 of Jebel Barkal with relief of Senkamanisken clubbing enemies, drawn in 1821 by Louis Maurice Adolphe Linant de Bellefonds

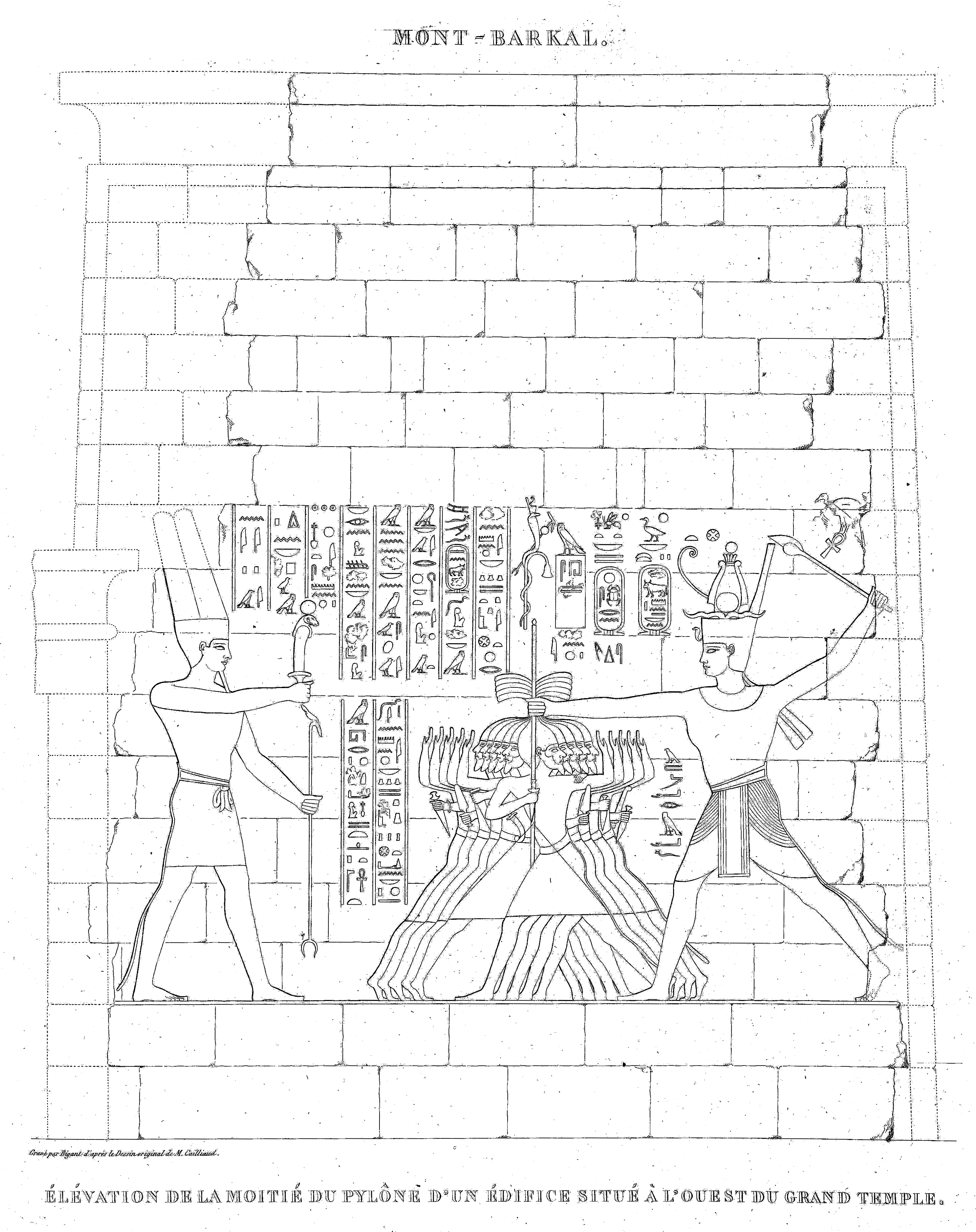
Senkamanisken slaying enemies in front of God Amun, at Jebel Barkal (pylon of building B 700, west of the main temple).

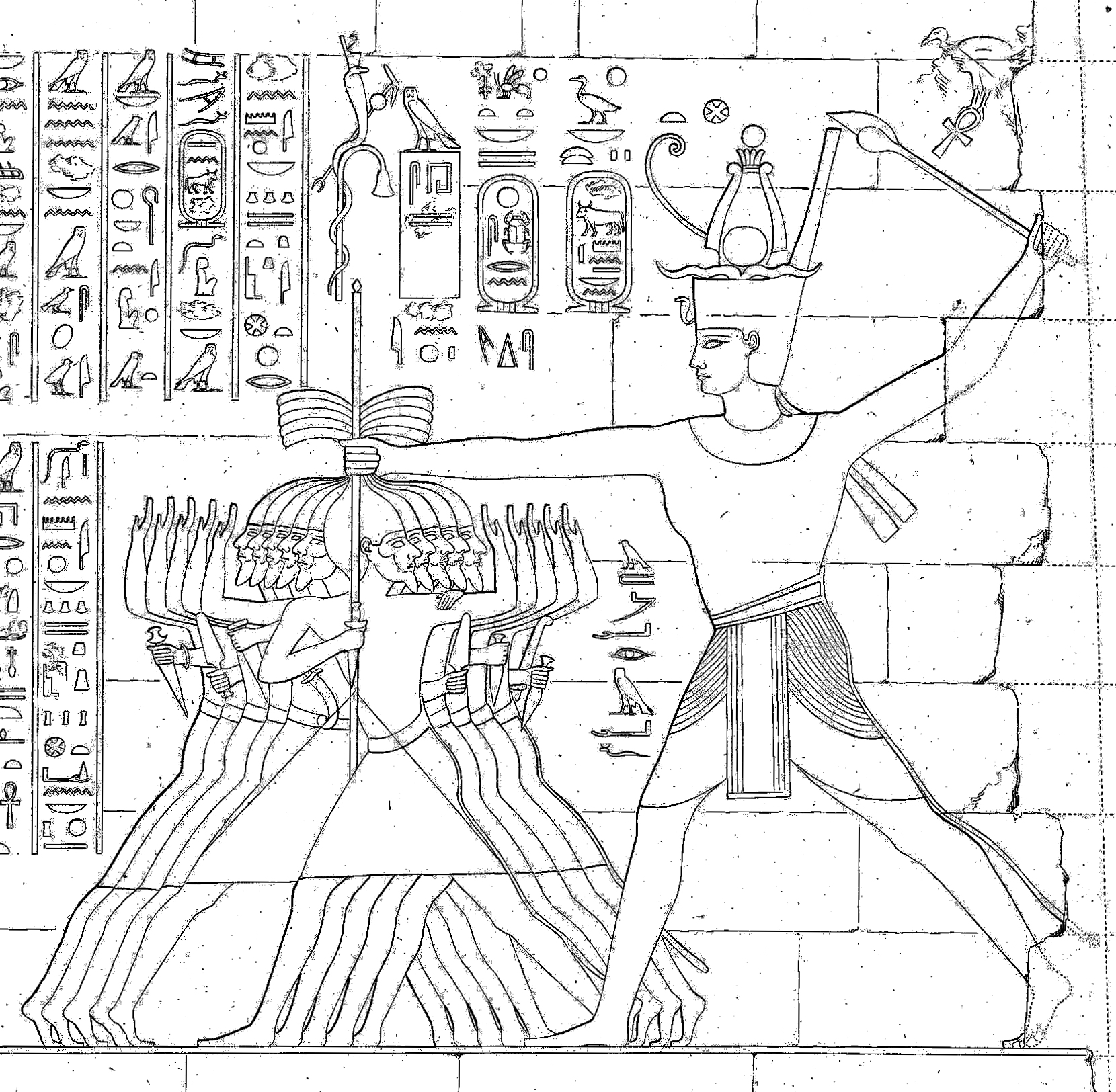
Senkamanisken slaying enemies at Jebel Barkal (detail).

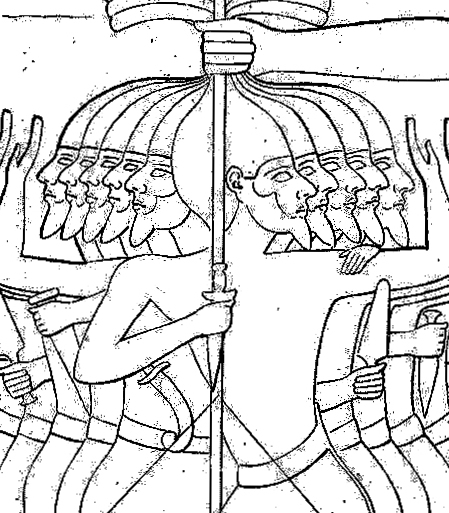
Detail of the enemies

Preceded by Atlanersa	Rulers of Kush	Succeeded by Anlamani
