= Serge Sauneron =

French Egyptologist (1927–1976)

Serge Sauneron (3 January 1927 – 3 June 1976) was a French Egyptologist. He was Director of the Institut Français d'Archéologie Orientale from 1969 to 1976. Notable publications include his work on the Priests of Ancient Egypt, entitled, Les prêtres de l'ancienne Égypte (1957) and Les songes et leur interprétation, published in 2 volumes (1959).

He was killed in a car accident on 3 June 1976.
