= Nasalsa =

Ancient Nubian queen consort

- Queen consort of Nubia and Egypt; King's Mother, Lady of Upper and Lower Egypt, etc
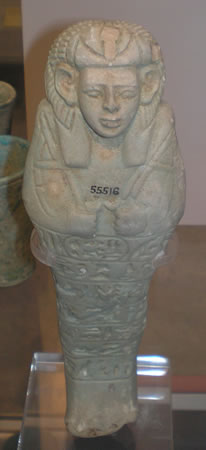
- Shabti of Queen Nasalsa (British Museum)
- Burial: Nuri (Nuri 24)
- Spouse: Pharaoh Senkamanisken
- Issue: King Anlamani, King Aspelta, Queen Madiqen
Names
- Nasalsa

< M23 M23 n n O34 E23 Aa18 Z1 >
Nasalsa
in hieroglyphs
Era: Kingdom of Kush
(780 BC–350 AD)

Nasalsa was a Nubian queen of the Kingdom of Kush. She is known from a shabti, some inscriptions on tablets and cups, text on the stela of Khaliut, a dedication inscription and a text from Kawa. Dodson mentions that Nasalsa is named on the Enthronement Stela of Atlanersa and on the Election and Adoption Stelae of Aspelta. These stelae were from Gebel Barkal.

== Life ==
Nasalsa was a daughter of Atlanersa, the sister-wife of Senkamanisken, and the mother of Kings Anlamani and Aspelta as well as of Queen Madiqen.

Anlamani's stela (Kawa VIII) has a passage describing Nasalsa being called and finding her son on the throne:

Now the king's mother Nasalsa, may she live forever, was amongst the royal sisters. The royal mother, sweet of love, was the mistress of all the wives. His Majesty sent companions in order that she may be brought. She found her son appearing like Horus on his throne. She was very greatly joyful after she saw the beauty of His Majesty.

Aspelta's Adoption stela refers to Nasalsa as the King's Sister, the King's Mother, Mistress of Cush, and Daughter of Re. The inscription states that Nasalsa was the daughter of King's Sister, the Adoratrix of Amen-Re at Thebes Amenirdis. The relationship is likely one through adoption, because the Adoratrix in Thebes was thought to be celibate. The mention of "Daughter of Re" was the first time a Queen of Kush had used that title.

The Chaliut Stela from Gebel Barkal B500 describes Nasalsa as being "as Isis was with Horus" when stating that Aspelta was on the Horus throne. This could mean that Nasalsa was a regent or co-regent.
