= Anlamani =

Kushite king

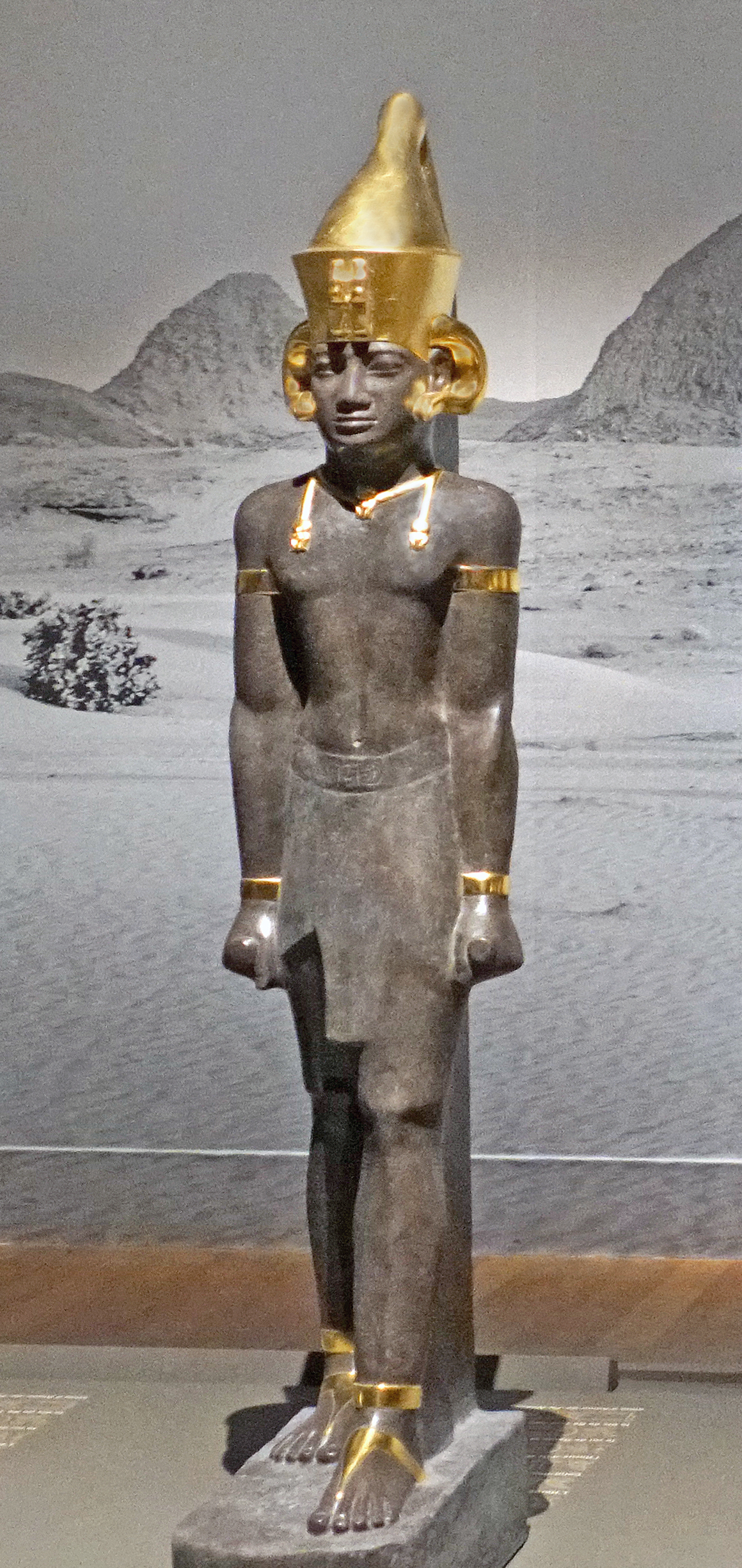
- Statue of Anlamani, Louvre Museum reconstruction

Kushite king of Napata
- Reign: c. 620–600 BC
- Predecessor: Senkamanisken
- Successor: Aspelta
Royal titulary
Horus name
Kanakht Khaemmaat
Strong Bull appears in Equity
Nebty name
Seankhibutawy
Nourisher of the Two Lands
Golden Horus
Her(y)hormaat
Who is satisfied with equity
Prenomen
Ankhkare
Ra is one whose ka lives

M23 X1 L2 X1	N5 anx kA
Nomen
Anlamani

G39 N5	i mn n i mn rw
- Consort: Mediken ?
- Father: Senkamanisken
- Mother: Nasalsa
- Burial: Nuri (Nu. 6)

Anlamani was the king of Kush from 620 BC until his death around 600 BC.

Under his reign, Kush experienced a revival in its power. Anlamani was the son of Senkamanisken, his predecessor, and the elder brother of Aspelta, his successor.

Anlamani used titles based on those of the Egyptian pharaohs.

== Reign ==
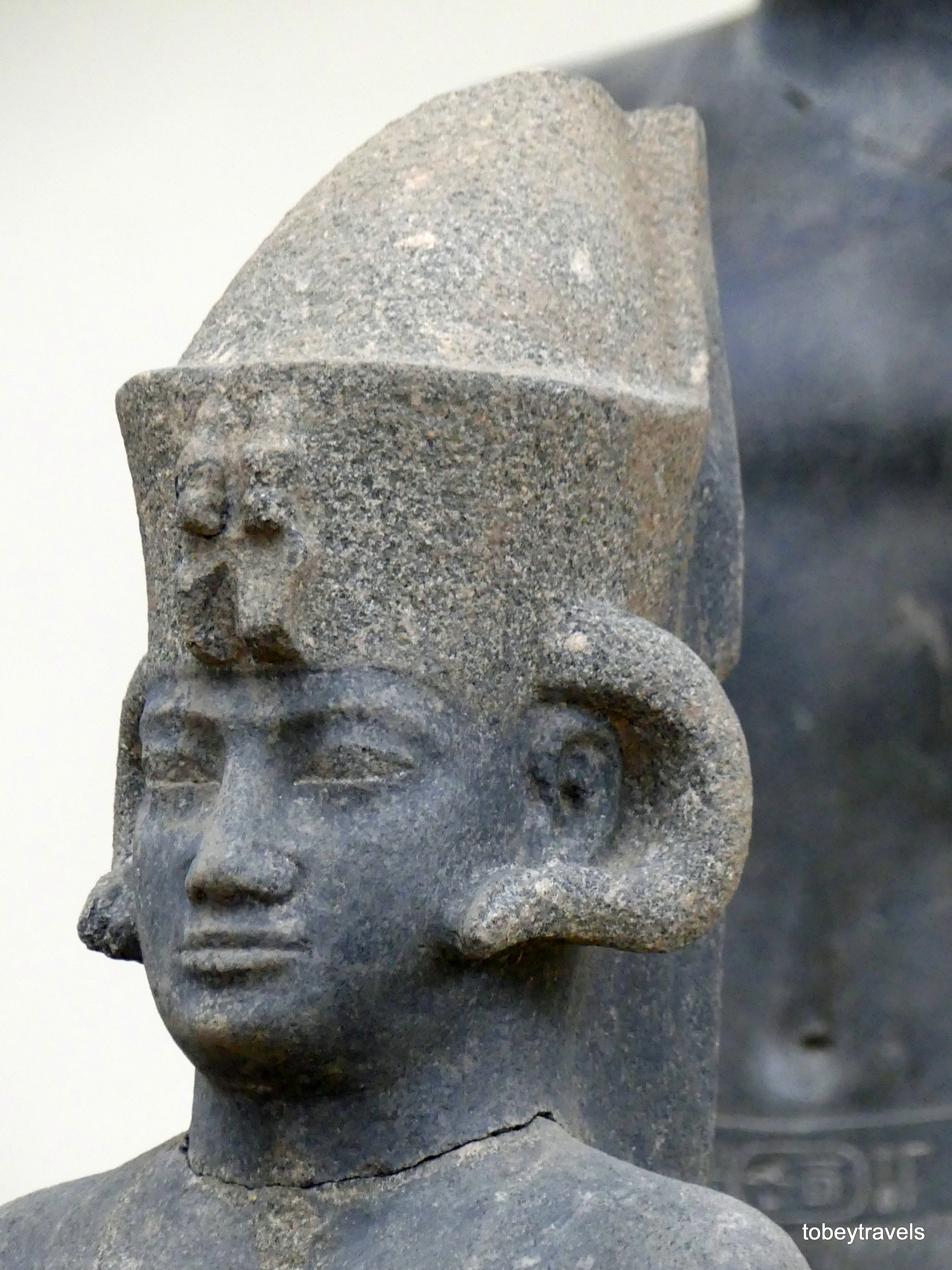
Portrait of Anlamani, Kerma Museum

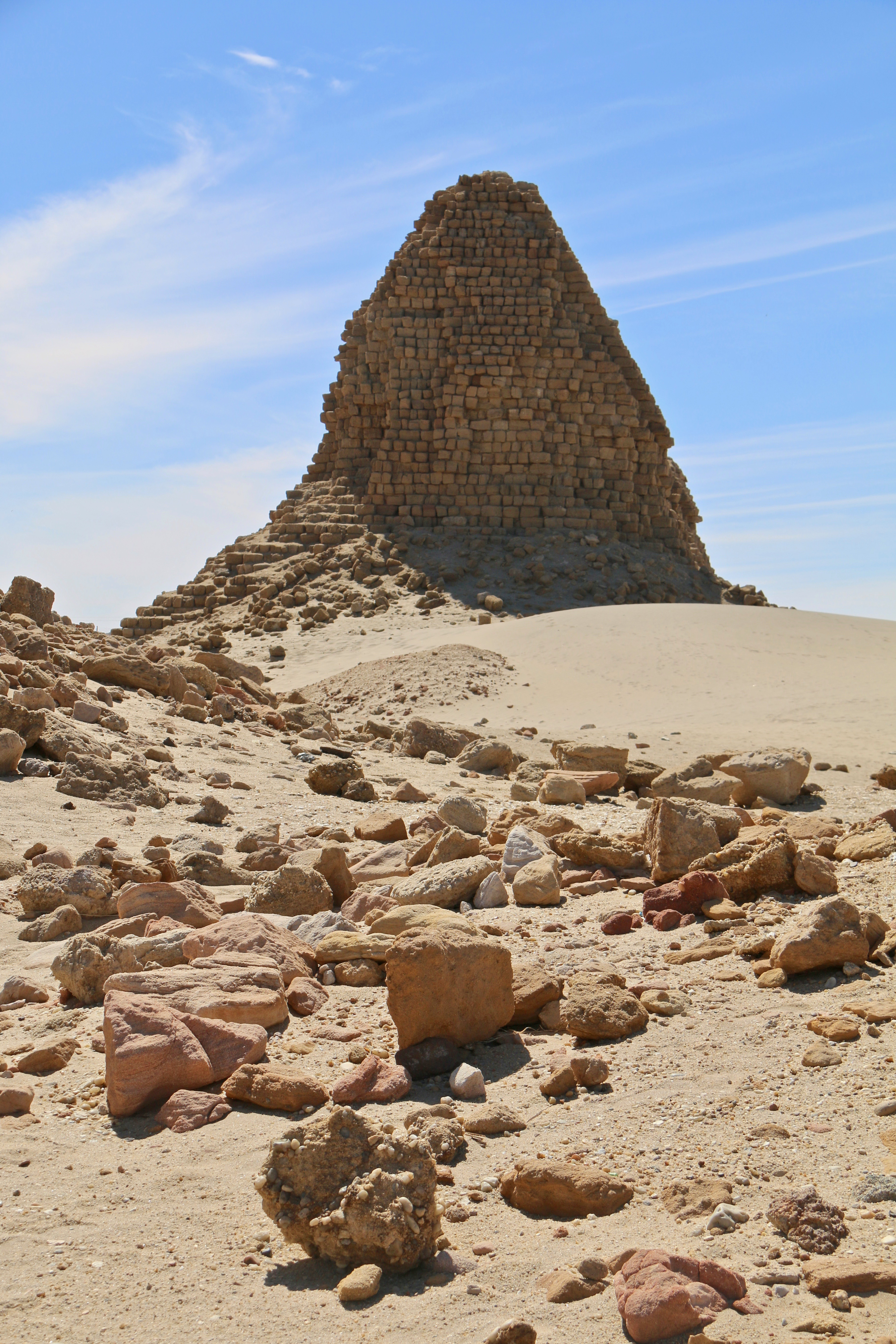
Anlamani's pyramid, Nuri, Sudan

Anlamani is particularly well known from a stela discovered in a temple at Kawa. The stela records his mother Nasalsa's visit to Kawa to watch his official coronation as king. It also notes his decision to make four of his sisters as "sistrum-players" in the National temple of Amun at Jebel Barkal and reports the king's campaign against certain nomadic tribes who threatened Kawa.

Two granite statues of this king have been found in Jebel Barkal while a block from Meroë bearing his name is known. One of the statues is today located in the National Museum of Khartoum, Sudan) while the other (a 12 foot high statue) is in the Boston Museum of Fine Arts. Anlamani was buried in pyramid Nu. 6 in Nuri. In his tomb stood a large chamber, decorated with religious texts, and his sarcophagus.

In 592 BC, under the reign of his brother Aspelta, the Egyptian king Psamtik II launched a campaign against Kush which resulted in the sack of Napata.

== Image gallery ==
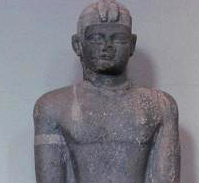
Photo of the Statue of Anlamani in the National Museum of Sudan in 2008(Current state unknown)

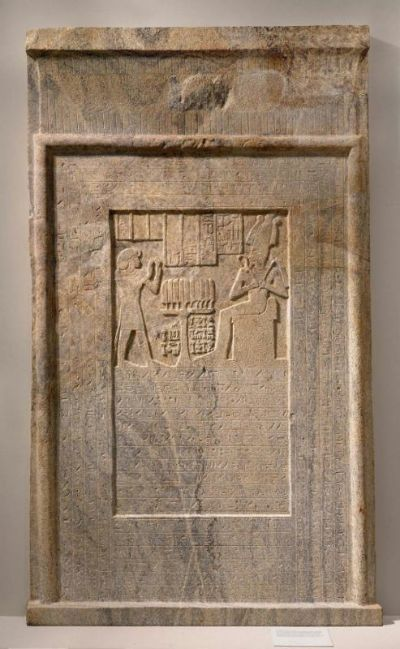
Stela of Anlamani

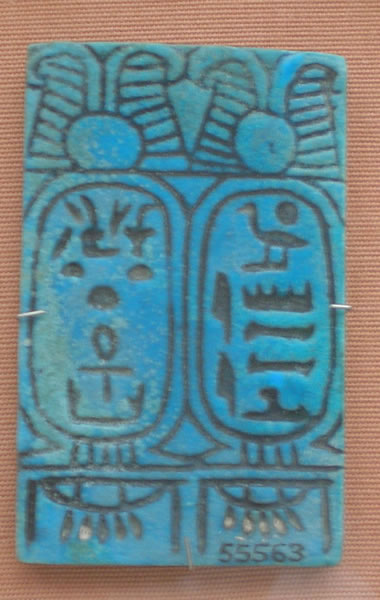
Cartouche of Anlamani

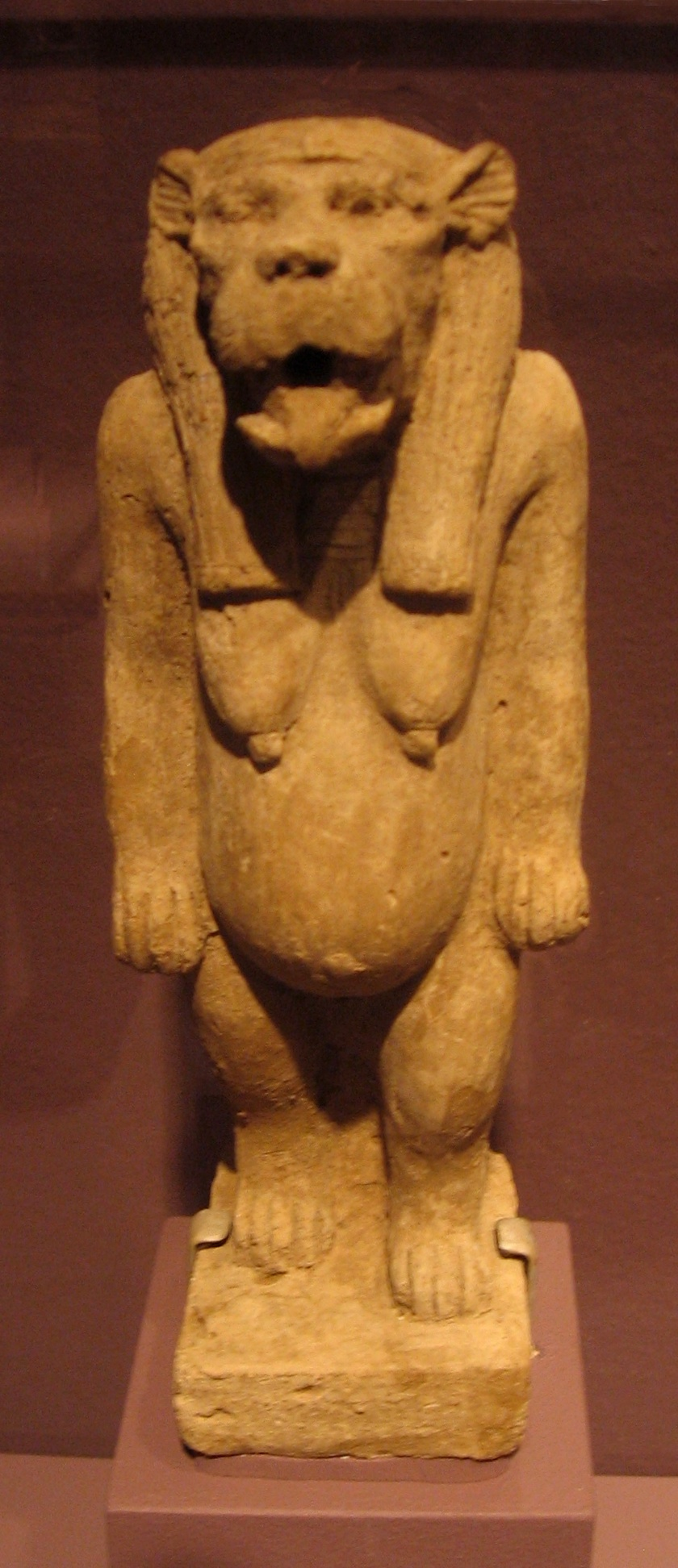
Taweret figure from the time of Anlamani

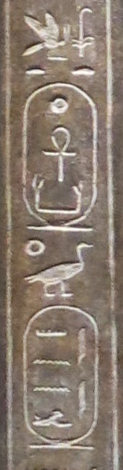
Prenomen and Nomen of Anlamani

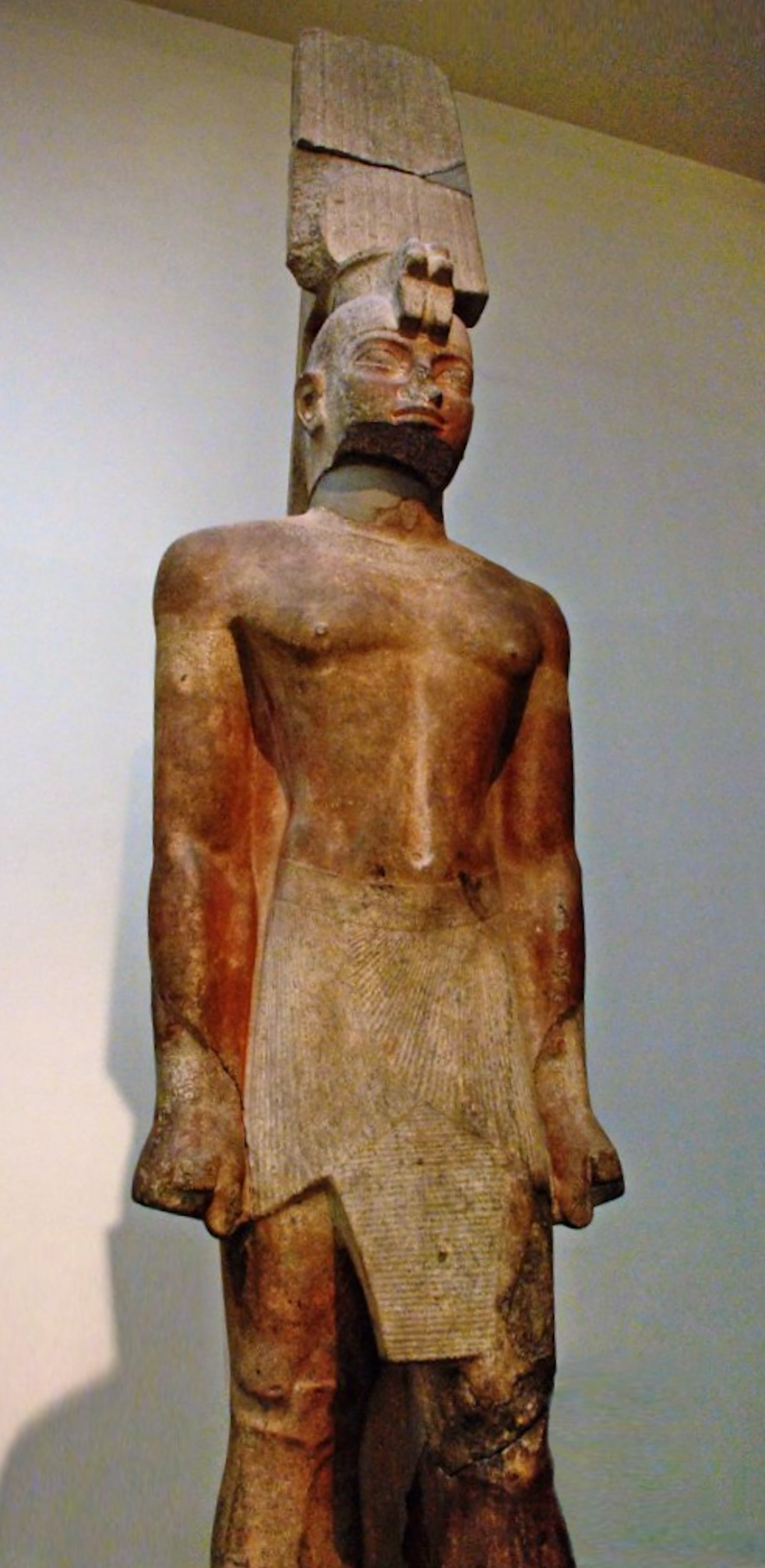
Statue of Anlamani, Boston Museum of Art.

Preceded by Senkamanisken	Rulers of Kush	Succeeded by Aspelta
