= Tesem =

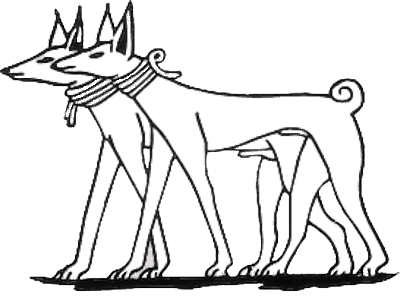
- A drawing of two Tesems
- Other names: ṯzm
- Origin: Ancient Egypt
- Breed status: Extinct

Tesem (Ancient Egyptian: ṯzm, tjezem;) was the ancient Egyptian name for "hunting dog". In popular literature it denotes the prick-eared, leggy dog with a curled tail from the early Egyptian age, but it was also used with reference to the lop-eared "Saluki/Sloughi" type. It was one of several types of dogs in Ancient Egypt; particularly the latter Saluki/Sloughi type of Tesem, having the appearance most similar to that of a true sighthound.

== History ==
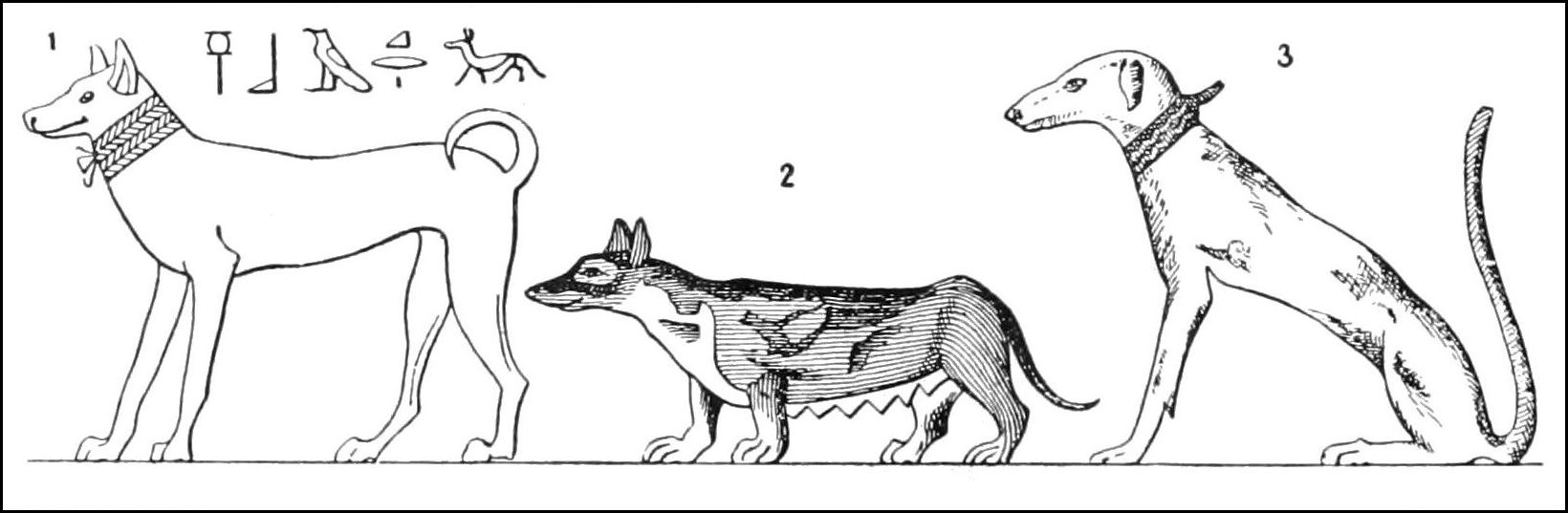
Examples of three different types of dogs shown on Egyptian monuments

Three main types of dogs are shown in Ancient Egypt, these being the pariah dog, the greyhound-like dog and a mastiff-type dog. It is assumed that there were two types of greyhound-like breeds, these being the older Tesem and the Saluki/Sloughi type. The two greyhound-types were clearly distinguished in tomb decorations, with the Tesem thought to be similar to modern pariah dogs. One scholar applies the name Tesem to both types of greyhound-like dogs.

The prick-eared Tesem's origins are presumed to be from further south than Egypt, from Nubia and also the Land of Punt, whose location is unclear but thought to be to the southeast of Egypt on the Horn of Africa.

A drawing of a Tesem-type dog appears in Nagada, dated from the Protodynastic Period of Egypt (dated 3200 BC to 3000 BC). The dogs were drawn with upright ears and a tightly curled tail. One of the earliest known recordings of these dogs is the "Khufu dog" from the tomb of Pharaoh Khufu, who reigned between 2609 and 2584 BC. This dog was named Akbaru, and was depicted wearing a collar.

They continued to appear during the Middle Kingdom period (2055 BC and 1650 BC), but by the time of the New Kingdom (1550 BC - 1069 BC), they were replaced by dogs with hanging ears and a straight tail. These dogs were of the Saluki/Sloughi type.

The Pharaoh Hound of Malta and the Cirneco dell'Etna of Sicily were both popularly and controversially thought to be possible descendants of the Tesem. The Basenji from Central Africa still shows certain similarities with the Tesem, for example the characteristic curly tail.

== Description ==
Ancient Egyptians gave the name Tesem to the early curly-tailed dogs that resembled a sighthound. These dogs were featured on monuments and in wall paintings that showed their lean body with noticeable prick ears. They had a greyish-yellow coat, with long legs and a broad prominent forehead. Their size exceeded the pariah dogs of the time. The structure of their skeleton was closer to that of the modern terrier than that of the modern greyhound.

== See also ==
- Africanis
- Set animal
- Abuwtiyuw
