= Puppy =

Juvenile dog

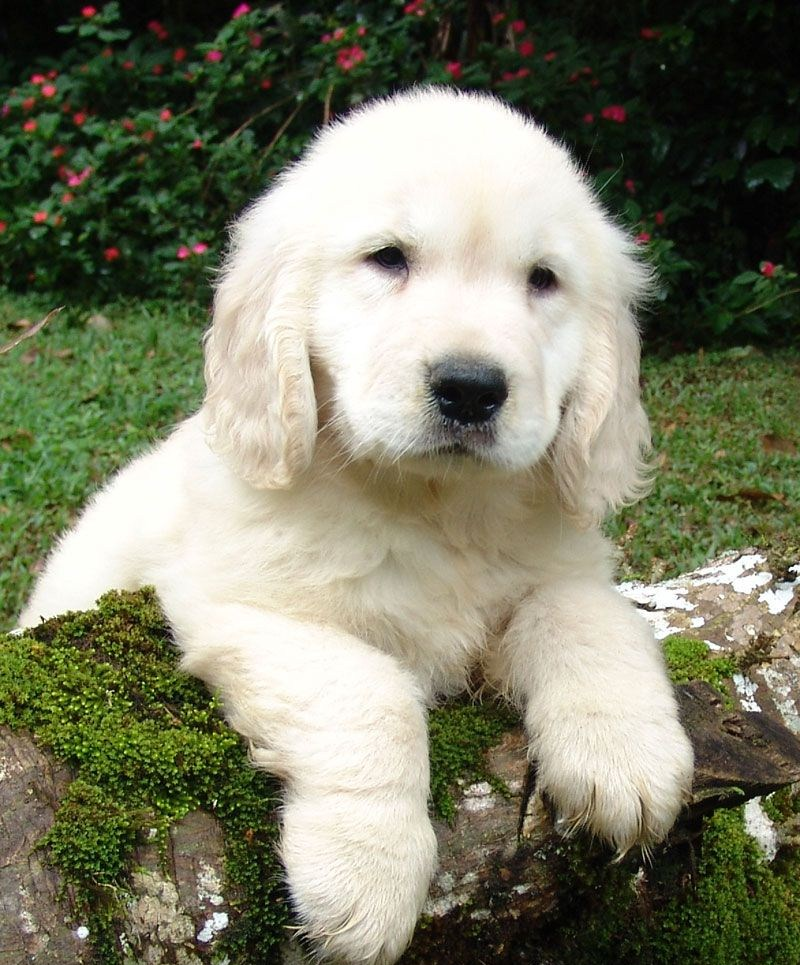
Golden Retriever puppy

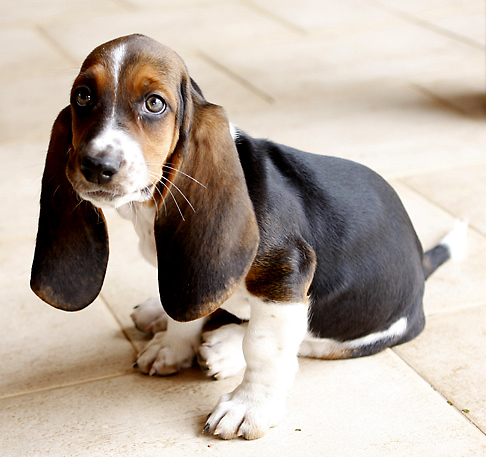
Basset Hound

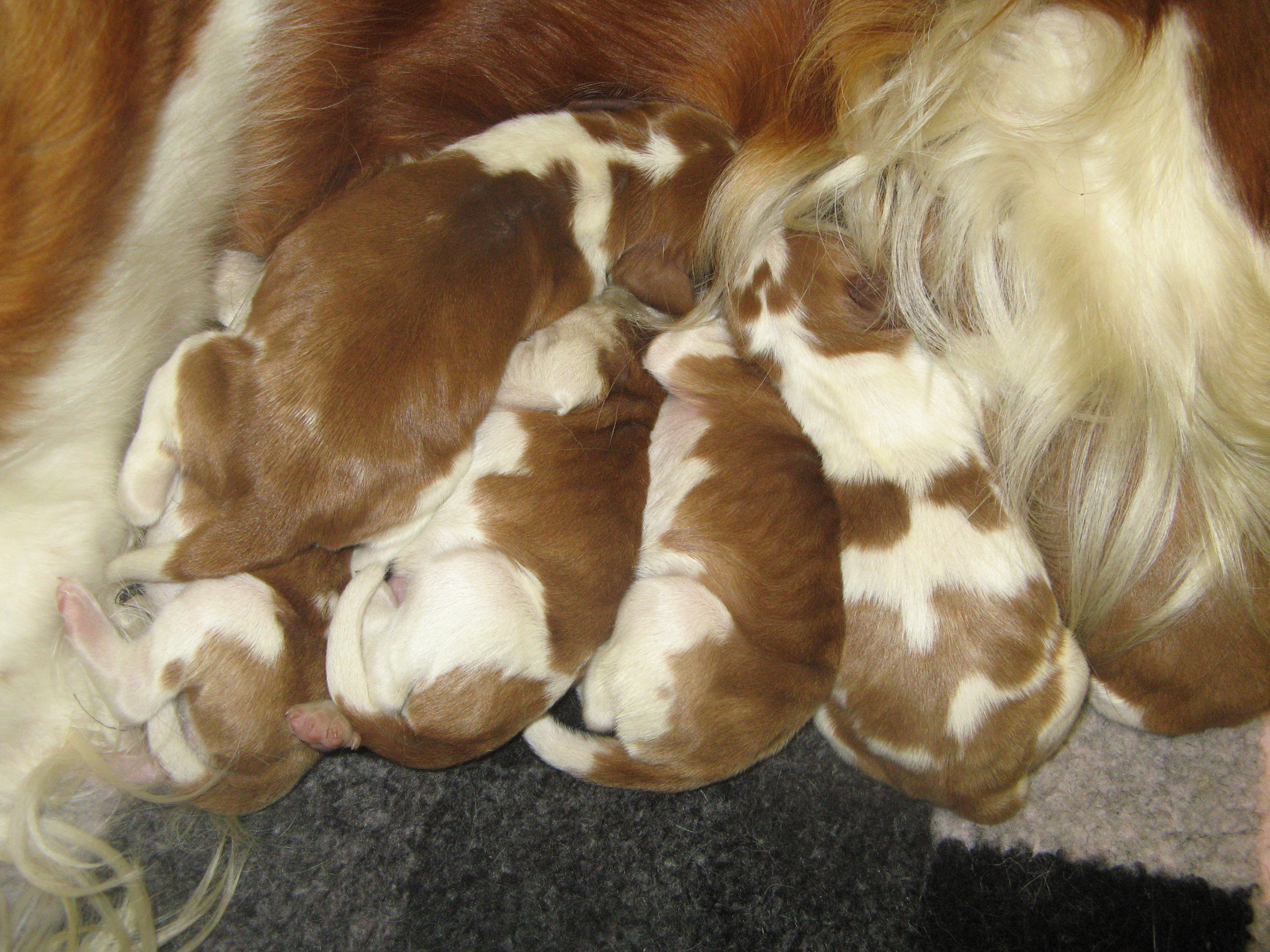
Newborn Welsh Springer Spaniels

Playing Miniature Pinscher puppy

A puppy is a juvenile dog, generally one less than 12–18 months old.

Puppies are markedly underdeveloped and dependent on their mothers at birth (displaying altriciality), but healthy puppies grow quickly and begin walking thereafter. Puppies generally weigh 250–450 grams (8–16 oz) shortly after birth, depending on the breed.

A puppy's coat colour may change as the puppy grows older, as is commonly seen in breeds such as the Yorkshire Terrier. Puppy refers specifically to young dogs, while pup may be used for other animals such as wolves, seals, giraffes, guinea pigs, rats, or sharks.

== Prenatal development ==
Dogs go through prenatal development before they are born, just like all animals do. The germinal stage, the embryonic stage, and the fetal stage are the three phases that make up this development.

The first stage of prenatal growth in dogs is known as the germinal stage, which starts at fertilization and lasts for about two weeks. The fertilized egg, also known as the zygote, travels through the fallopian tube to the uterus during this period while undergoing rapid cell division. The placenta, which will feed the growing puppy, is formed once the zygote enters the uterus and settles in the uterine wall.

The embryonic period lasts from about day 14 of pregnancy until day 28 or so. With the growth of important organs and body systems, the embryo starts to take on a more recognizable shape at this stage. This involves the development of the digestive system, brain, heart, and lungs. An ultrasound can show the embryo at this time, which is about the size of a grape.

Around day 28 is when the fetal period starts, and it lasts until day 63, when the puppy is born. The puppy's organs and systems continue to develop and refine during this period of growth and development. It also involves the ability to control its own body temperature as well as the maturation of the senses, such as hearing and sight. The puppy is completely developed and prepared for birth by the time the fetal period is over.

== Development ==
Puppies are born after an average of 63 days of gestation, emerging in an amnion that is bitten off and eaten by the mother dog. Puppies begin to nurse almost immediately. If the litter exceeds six puppies, particularly if one or more are obvious runts, human intervention in hand-feeding the stronger puppies is necessary to ensure that the runts get proper nourishment and attention from the mother. As they reach one month of age, puppies are gradually weaned and begin to eat solid food. The mother may regurgitate partially digested food for the puppies or might let them eat some of her solid food. The mother usually refuses to nurse at this stage, though she might let them occasionally nurse for comfort.

At first, puppies spend the large majority of their time sleeping and the rest feeding. They instinctively pile together into a heap, and become distressed if separated from physical contact with their littermates by even a short distance.

Puppies are born with a fully functional sense of smell. They are unable to open their eyes. During their first two weeks, a puppy's senses all develop rapidly. During this stage the nose is the primary sense organ used by puppies to find their mother's teats, and to locate their littermates, if they become separated by a short distance. Puppies open their eyes about nine to eleven days following birth. At first, their retinas are poorly developed and their vision is poor. Puppies are not able to see as well as adult dogs. In addition, puppies' ears remain sealed until about thirteen to seventeen days after birth, after which they respond more actively to sounds. Between two and four weeks old, puppies usually begin to growl, bite, wag their tails, and bark.

Puppies develop very quickly during their first three months, particularly after their eyes and ears open and they are no longer completely dependent on their mother. Their coordination and strength improve, they spar with their littermates, and begin to explore the world outside the nest. They play wrestling, chase, dominance, and tug-of-war games.

A puppy Chihuahua (right) and puppy Toy Poodle playing in a Tokyo pet store, 2020

== Socialization ==
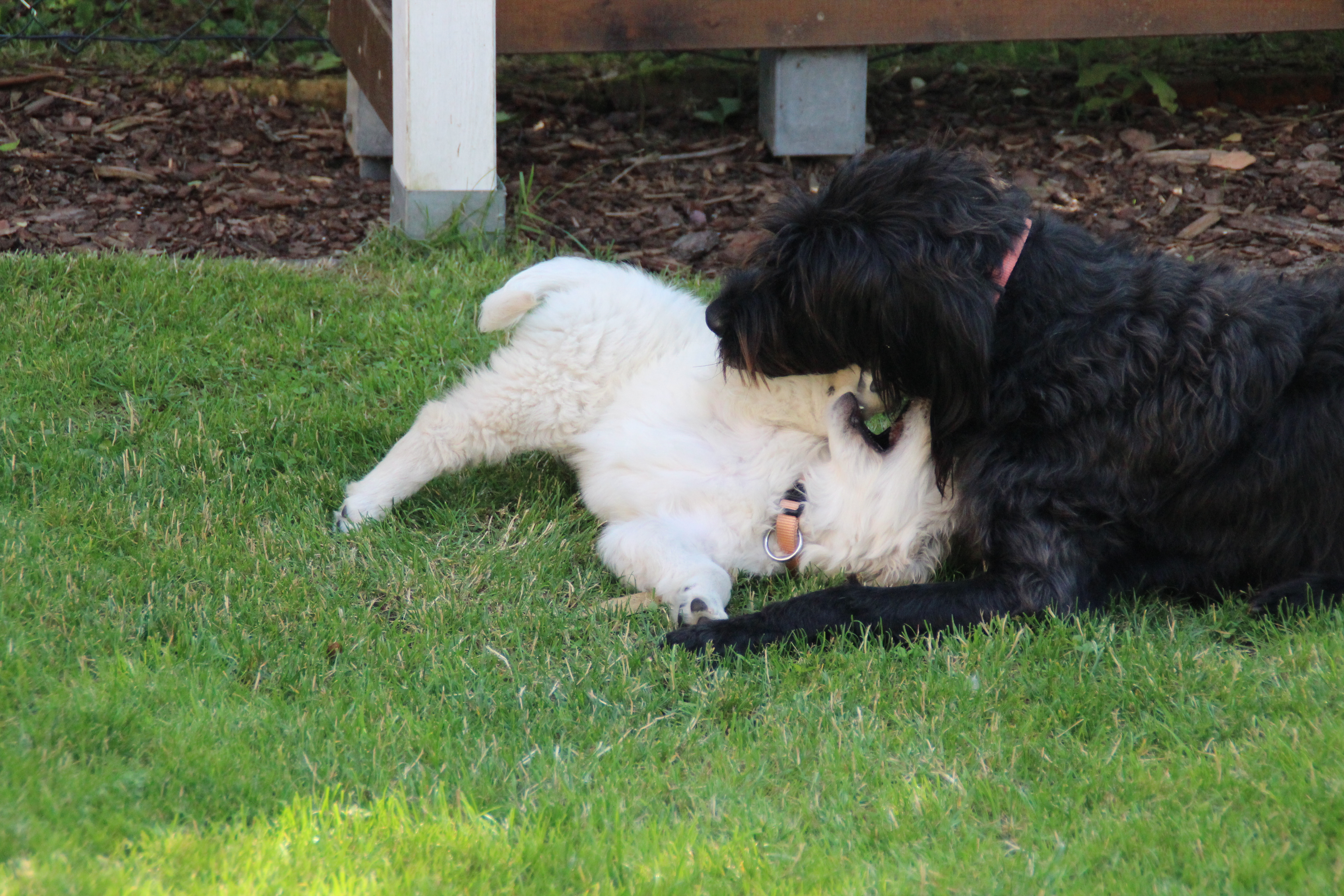
A labradoodle puppy and a Golden Retriever puppy playing together

Puppies are highly social animals and spend most of their waking hours interacting with their mother or littermates. When puppies are socialized with humans, particularly between the ages of eight and twelve weeks, they develop important social skills.

Puppies that do not receive adequate socialization during this critical period may be more likely to display fearful behaviour toward people, other dogs, or unfamiliar situations later in life. Many puppies also experience a developmental fear period between approximately 8 and 12 weeks of age, during which they may temporarily become more cautious or fearful of previously familiar people, objects, or environments.

The optimum period for socialisation is between eight and twelve weeks; professional animal trainers and the American Kennel Club advise puppies should be introduced to "100 People by 12 Weeks" and have encountered a wide and varied selection of people and environments.

== Docking and declawing ==
The practice of docking began primarily as a preventive measure for injury among working dogs. Docking is now primarily performed for purely cosmetic reasons, and some breeds traditionally have their tails cropped anywhere from slightly to almost entirely. Many countries now ban cropping and docking for cosmetic purposes, including Australia, parts of Canada, the majority of the European countries (Austria, Greece, Finland, Netherlands, Italy, the Czech Republic, Turkey, Poland, Slovakia, England, Scotland, Slovenia, Ireland, Norway and Sweden), while others, such as the United States, permit it. As of 2008, the practice is opposed by the American Veterinary Medical Association. Some breeders also prefer to declaw the dogs to prevent future injuries caused by scratching, or in the case of dewclaws, ingrown and ripped-off nails. Docking and declawing procedures are usually performed within the first few days after birth, by a veterinarian, or by an experienced breeder.

== Gallery ==
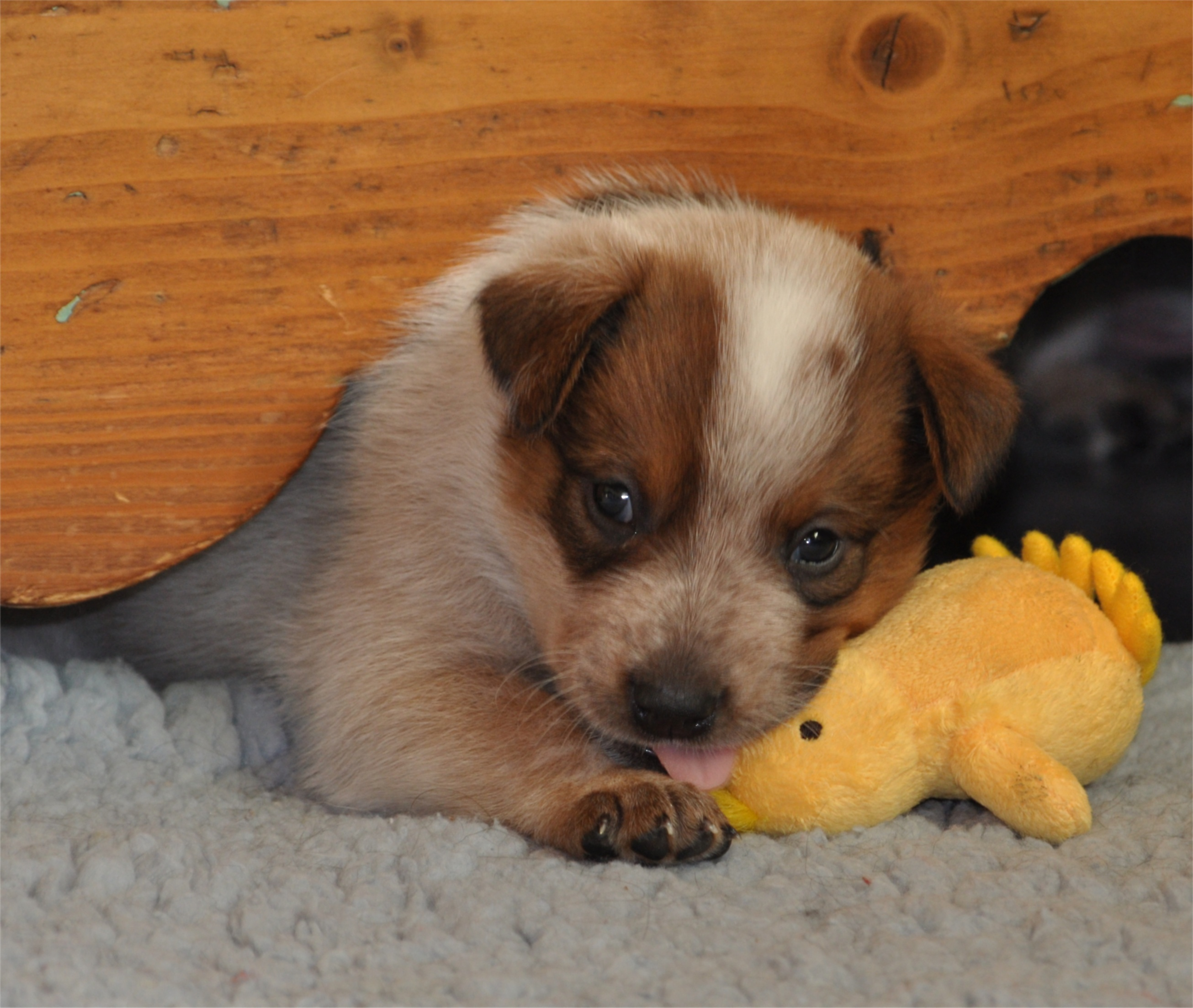
Australian Cattle Dog puppy

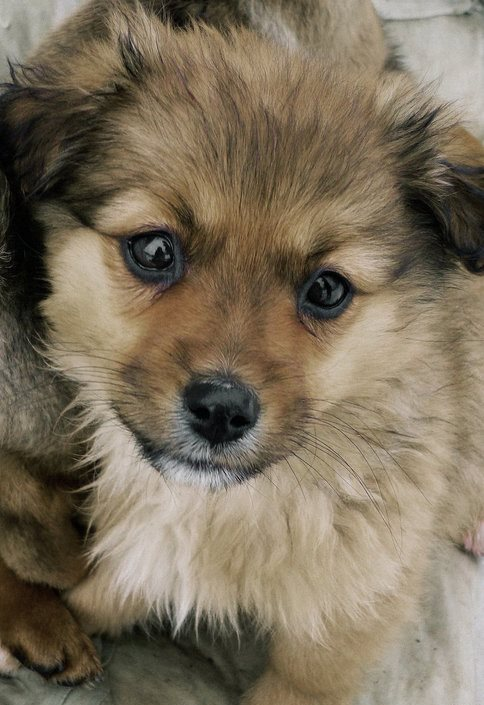
A mongrel puppy

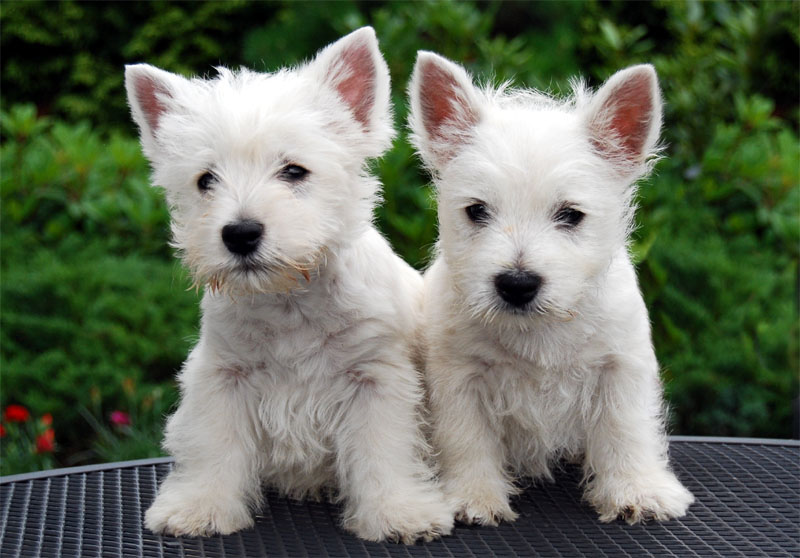
West Highland White Terrier puppies

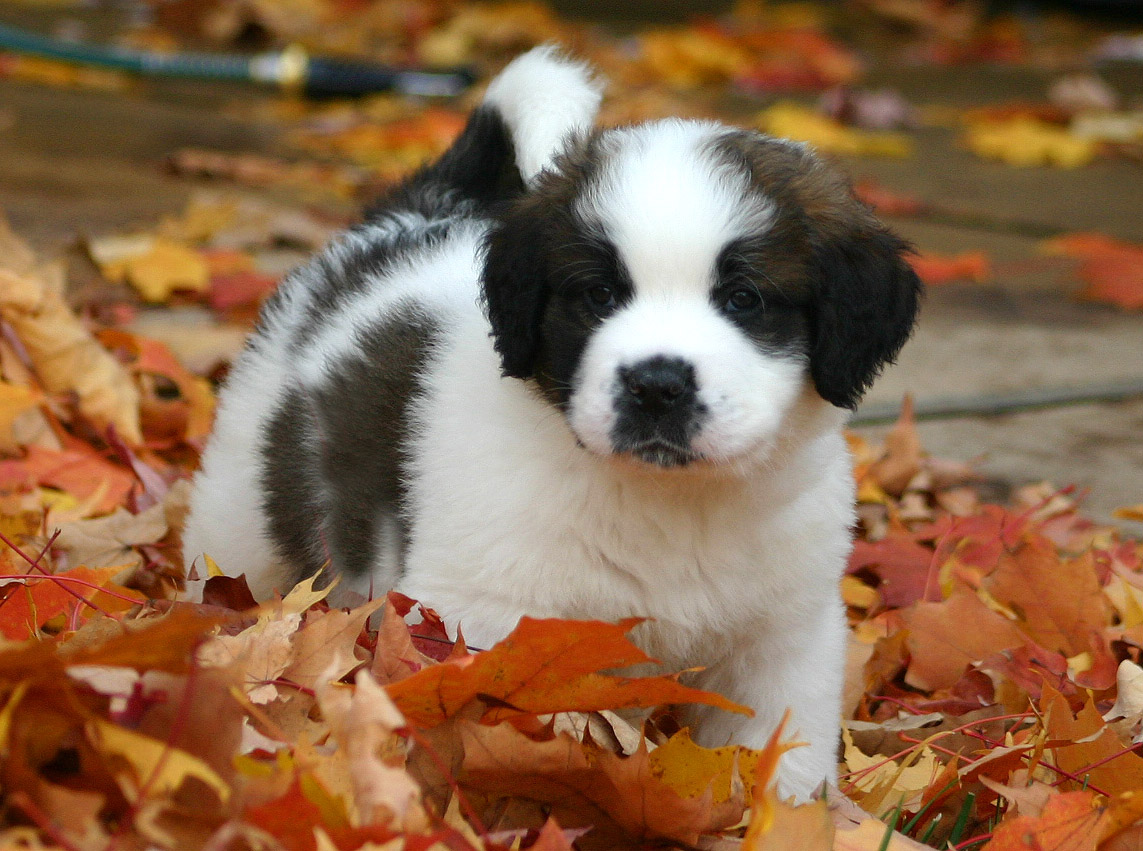
St. Bernard puppy

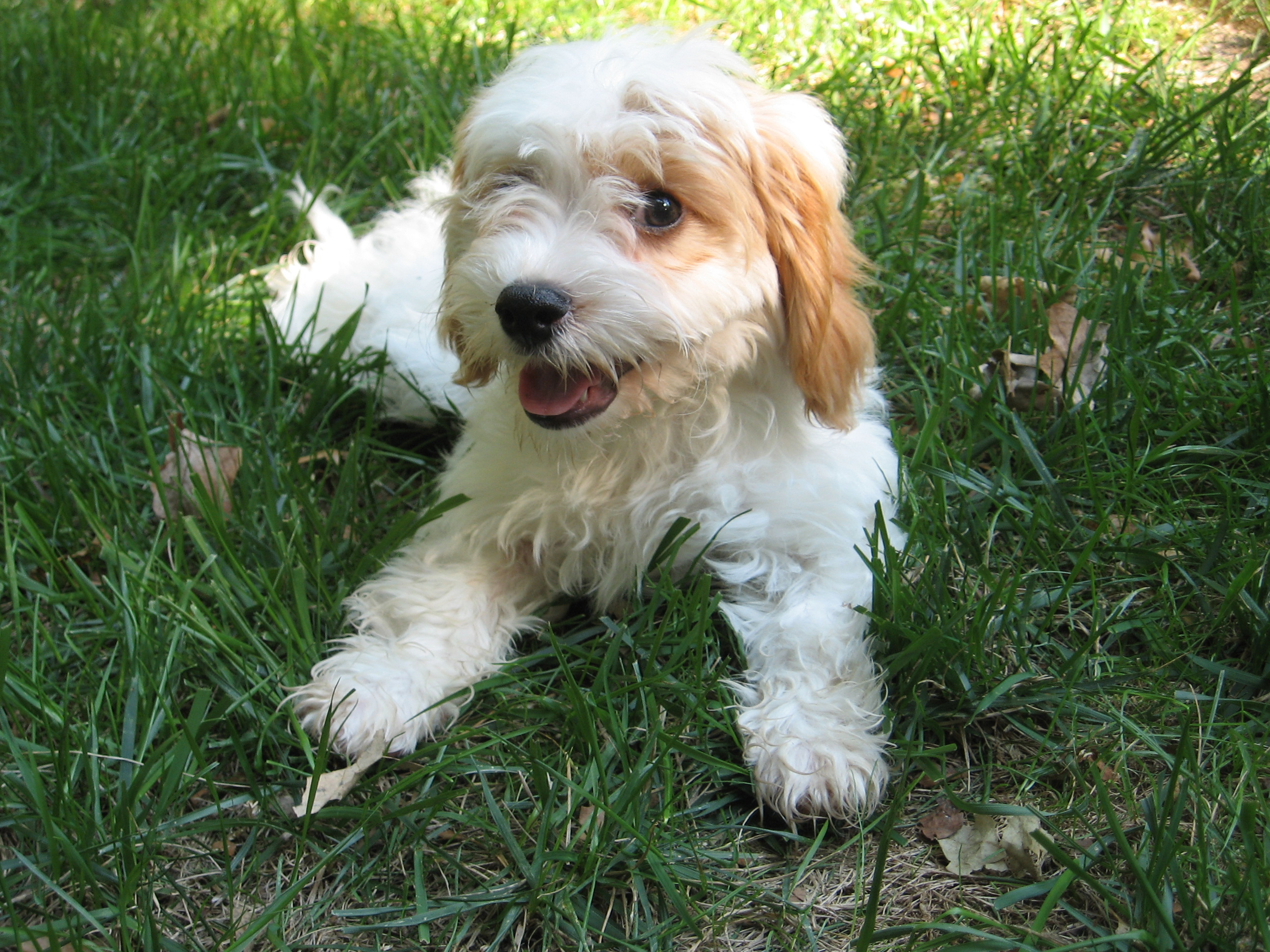
Cavapoo puppy

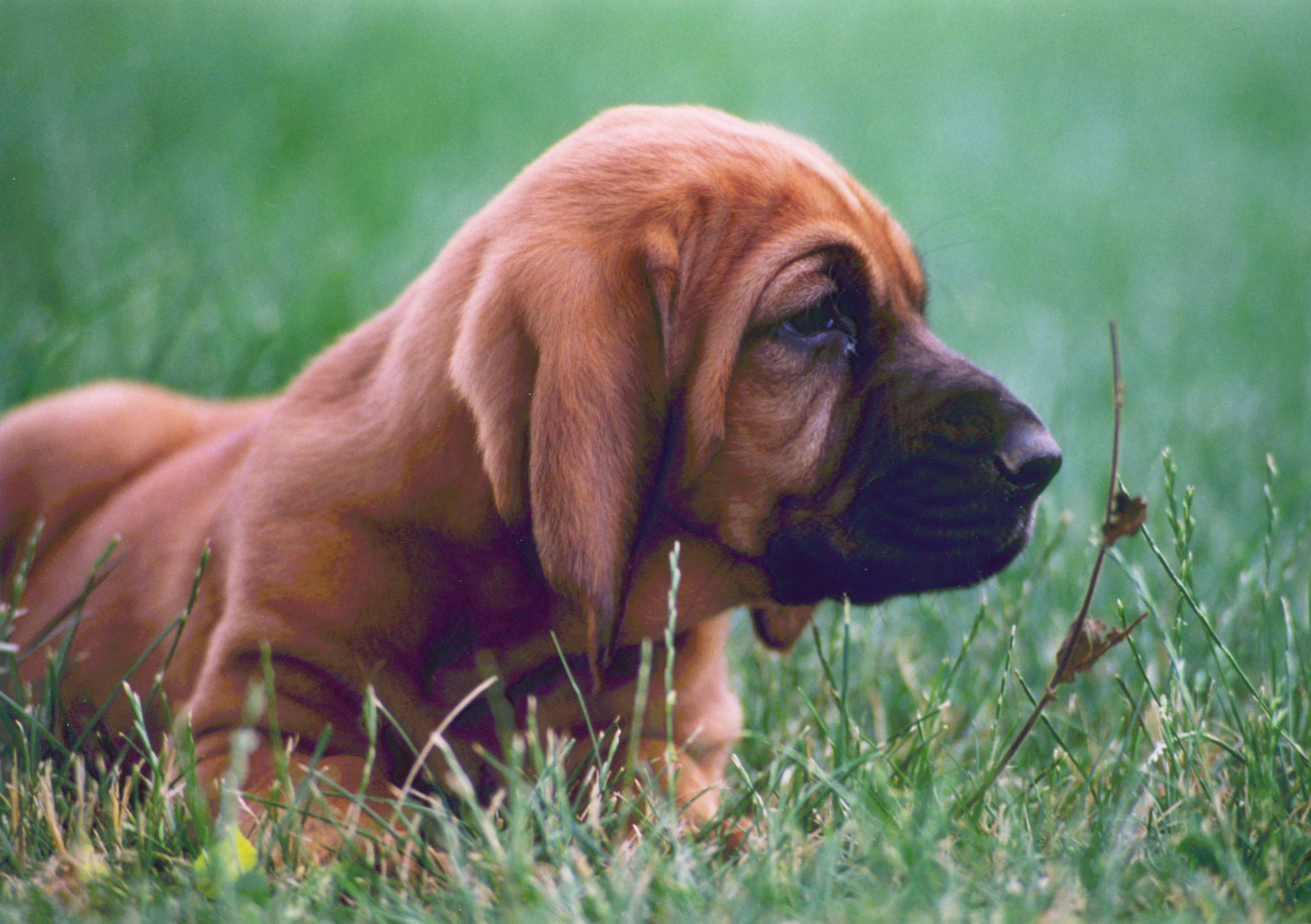
Bloodhound puppy

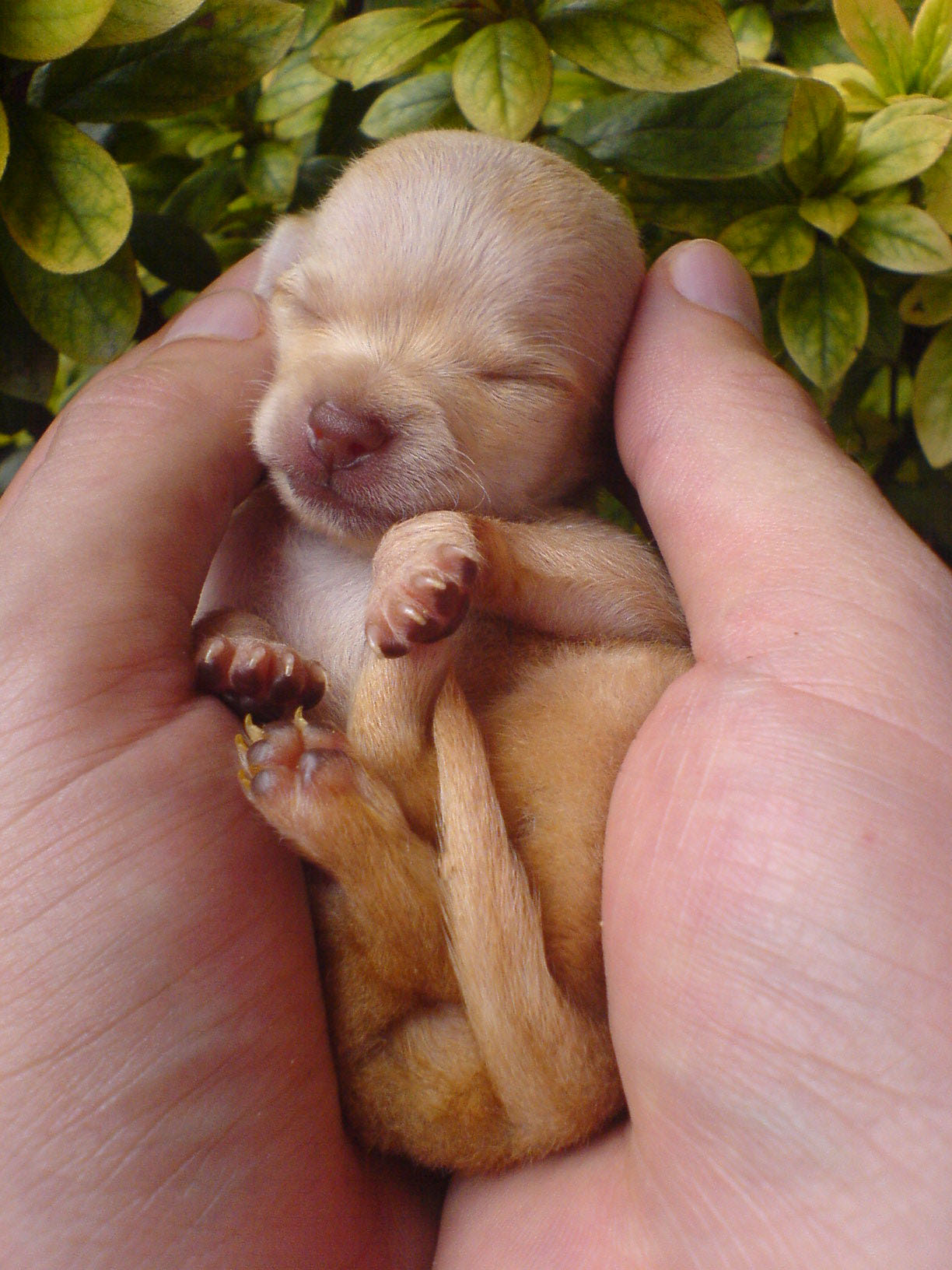
Chihuahua puppy

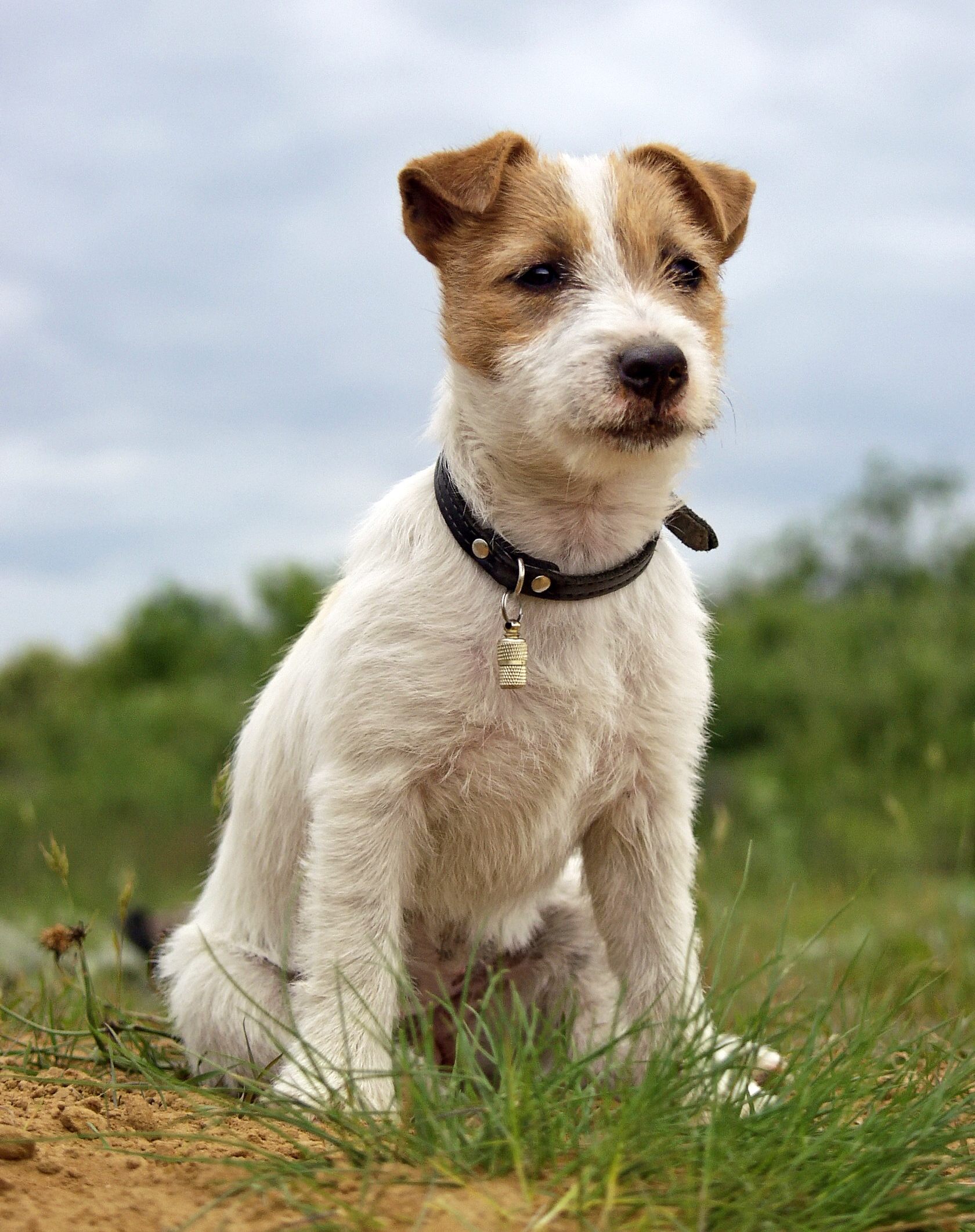
Jack Russell Terrier puppy

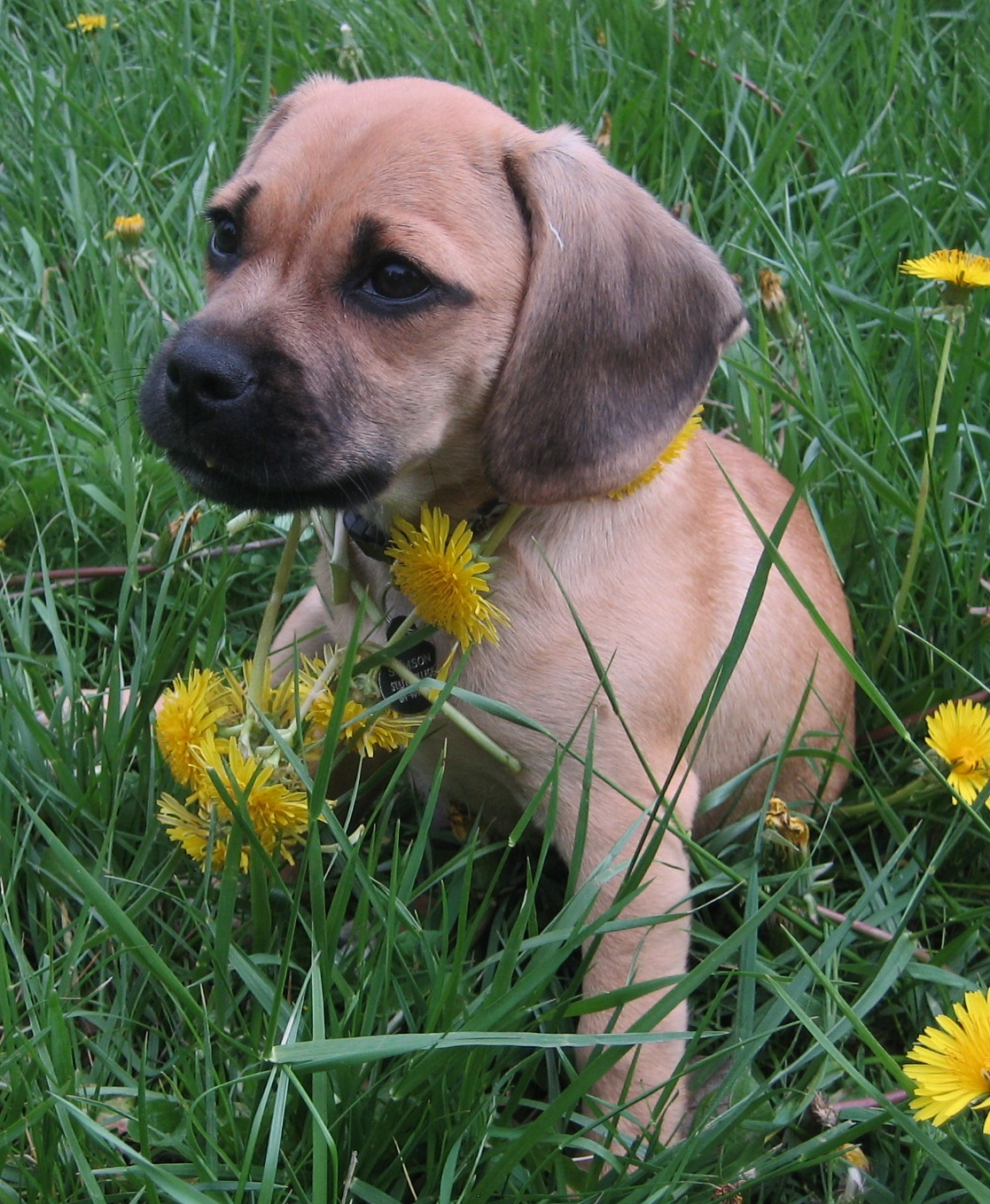
Puggle puppy

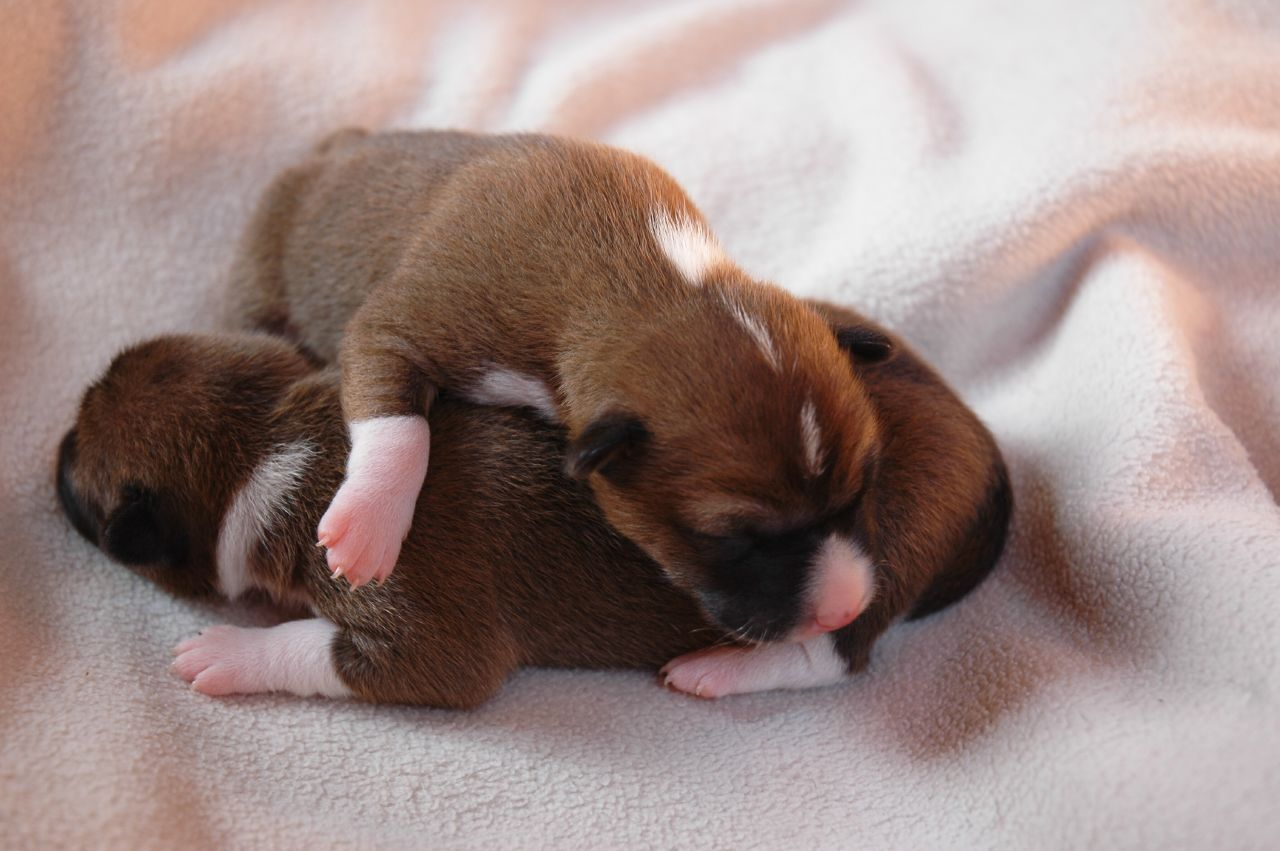
Newborn Basenji puppies

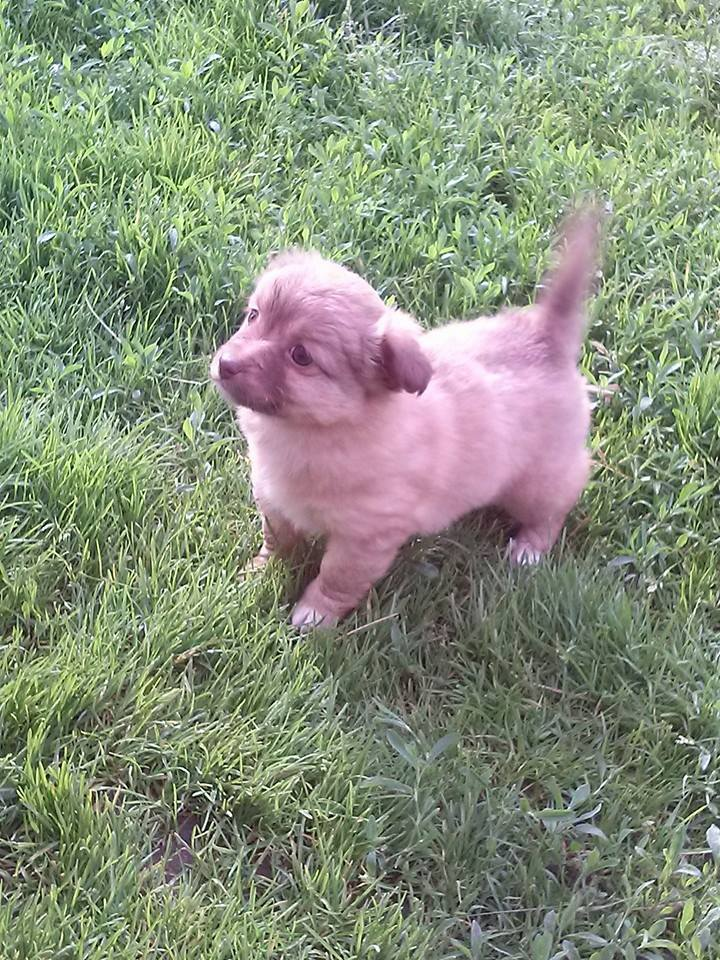
German Spitz puppy

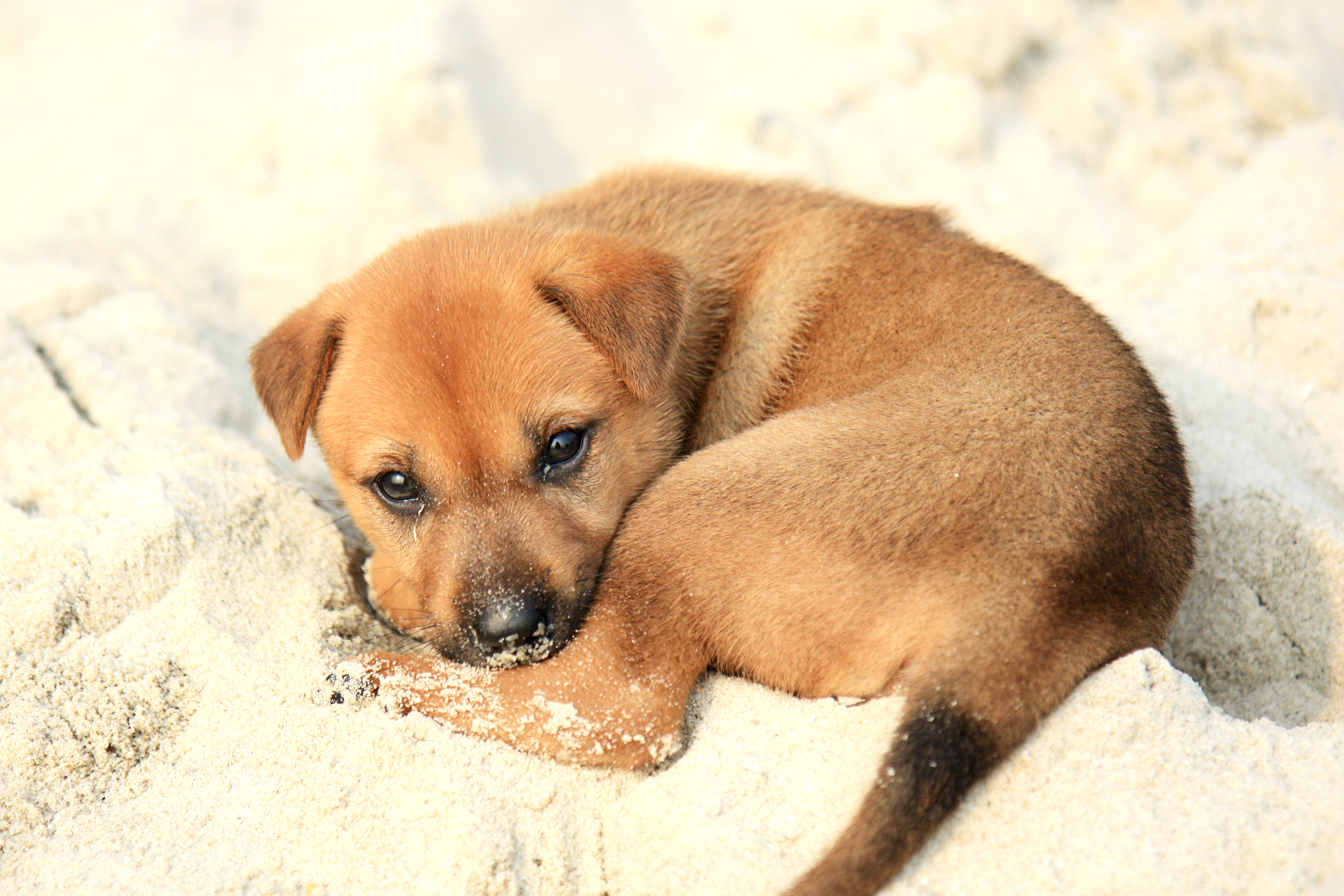
A little mongrel puppy on the shore, on Halong Bay

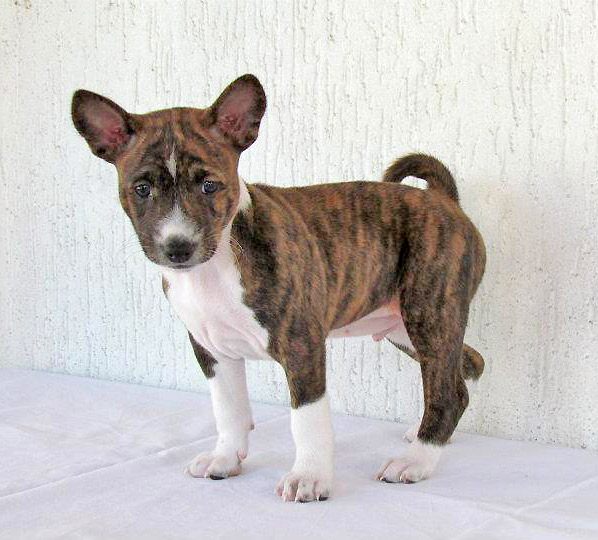
Basenji puppy

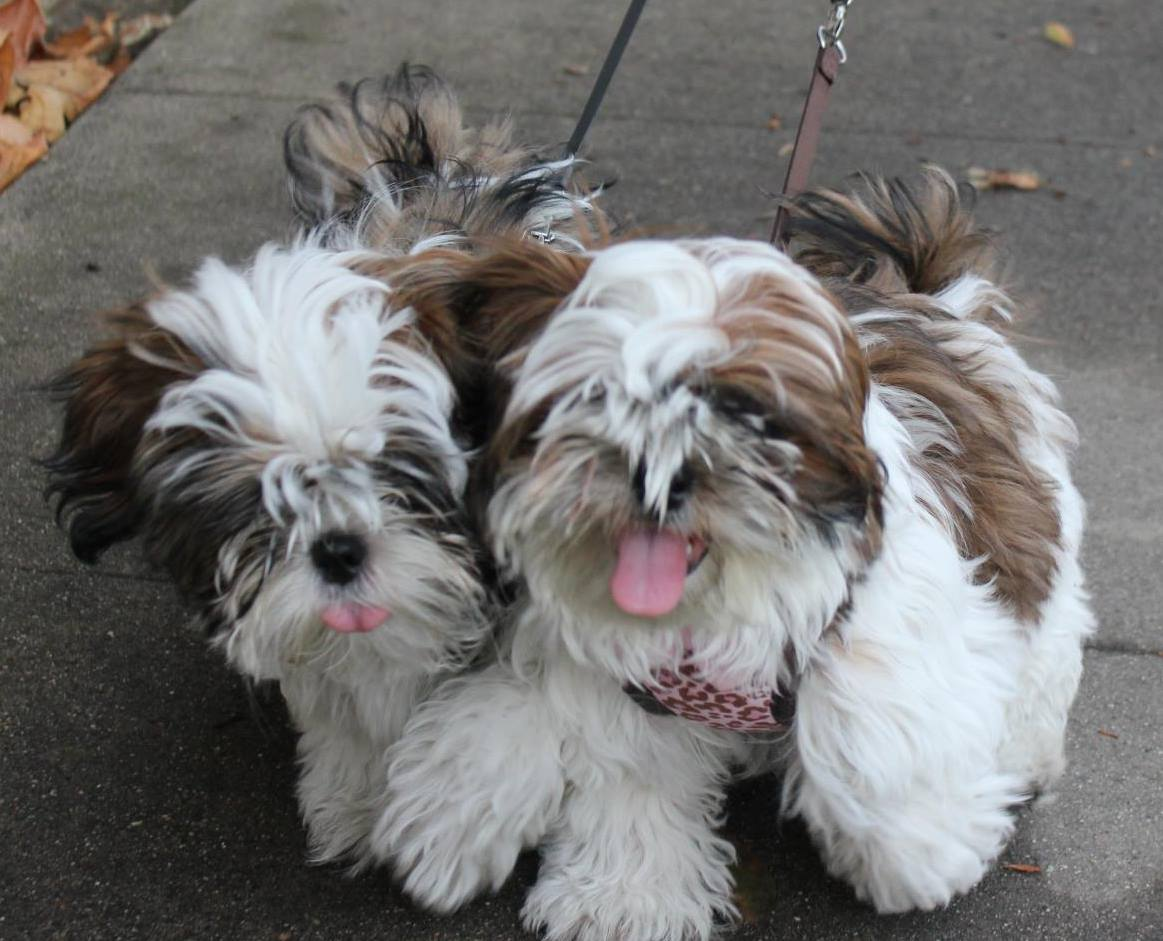
Two Shih Tzu puppies

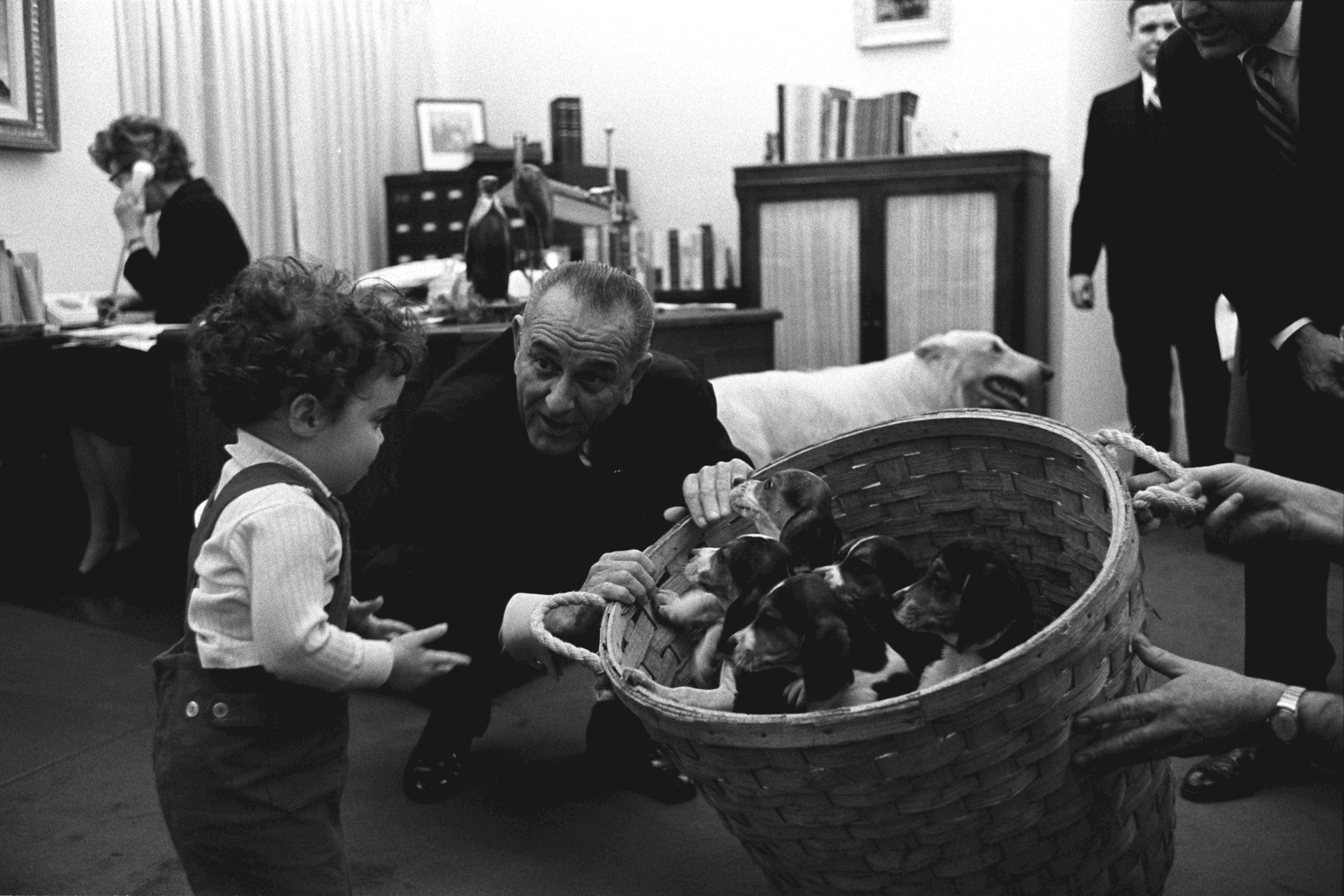
President Lyndon B. Johnson with a basket of puppies in 1966

== See also ==
- Pentulive (lit. 'Puppy Live')
