= Armant (dog breed) =

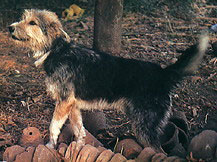
- Tri-colour Armant
- Other names: Egyptian Sheepdog, Ermenti, Sabe, Hawara Dog
- Origin: Egypt
Traits
- Height: Approx 56 cm (22 in)
- Weight: 23–27 kg (51–60 lb)
- Coat: Long, shaggy & rough
- Colour: Black, black & tan, tri-colour, grey and greyish yellow
Kennel club standards
- Egyptian Kennel Fédération: standard

The Armant (also known as the Egyptian Sheepdog or Ermenti) is a breed of herding dog from Egypt. The breed is not well known outside of Egypt but is used extensively within Egypt as both a herding dog and a guard dog.

== History ==
There are several conflicting theories regarding the origin of the Armant. One theory is that the Armant descends from briards brought to Egypt by Napoleon's armies, (Note: The Briard is reputed to have accompanied Napoleon's armies, driving flocks of sheep for the army's quartermasters.) these dogs were likely crossed with local dogs to produce the first examples of the breed. Another is that the dogs arrived with Russian travelers in the 1800s. However, Morris suggests in his book that while both theories may be useful in explaining the thick, shaggy coat, these theories lack supporting evidence. Conversely, the Egyptian Kennel Federation believes they are entirely of African origin, with Morris suggesting a relationship to North African village dogs, a theory that has become increasingly popular in recent years.

The Armant is named after the town of Armant, Egypt, the supposed place of origin of the breed. It is also called the Hawara dog, after the Hawwara tribal confederation who used them with their livestock.

The breed is now endangered due to crossbreeding with other dog breeds. They are now recognized by the Egyptian Kennel Federation and efforts are underway by the Egyptian Armant Herding Club to find and preserve purebred examples.

== Characteristics ==
The Armant is a medium-sized, rectangular dog, typically weighing between 50 and 65 pounds with females standing 45–55 centimetres (18–22 in) tall and males standing 50–60 centimetres (20–24 in). It comes in a variety of colors including black, black and white, grizzled, or light-brown. It has a rough, shaggy coat. While the breed is never docked, some dogs are born with a hereditary bobtail.

Armants are brave and intelligent sheep herding dogs who are loyal to their owners and cautious of strangers. They are ferocious in defense of their flock, earning them the name Sabe, which means lion in Arabic.

== See also ==
- List of dog breeds

== Sources ==
- Acton, C.R. (1952). The dog owner's handbook. London: Herbert Jenkins. p. 18.
- Alderton, David (1984). The dog:the most complete, illustrated, practical guide to dogs and their world. London: Quill Publishing Ltd. p. 55. ISBN 0-89009-786-0.
- Davis, Henry P. (1970). The new dog encyclopedia. Harrisburg, PA: Stackpole Books. p. 201.
- Hancock, David (2014). Dogs of the shepherds: a review of the pastoral breeds. Ramsbury, Wiltshire: The Crowood Press Ltd. p. 95. ISBN 978-1-84797-808-0.
- Morris, Desmond (2002). Dogs: The Ultimate Dictionary of over 1,000 Breeds. Trafalgar Square Publishing. ISBN 978-1570762192.
- Wilcox, Bonnie; Walkowicz, Chris (1995). Atlas of dog breeds of the world. Neptune City, N.J.: TFH Publications. p. 131.
