= Abutiu =

Sixth Dynasty Egyptian dog, one of the earliest documented domestic animals

Abutiu in hieroglyphs
a b w tyw E14
ꜥbwtjw
Name and transliteration following Reisner
𓂝𓃀𓅱𓄿𓃡

Abutiu (Ancient Egyptian: 𓂝𓃀𓅱𓄿𓃡; died before 2280 BC), also transcribed as Abuwtiyuw, was an Egyptian dog and one of the earliest documented domestic animals whose name is known. He is believed to have been a royal guard dog who lived in the Sixth Dynasty (2345–2181 BC), and received an elaborate ceremonial burial in the Giza Necropolis at the behest of a pharaoh whose name is unknown.

An inscribed stone listing the gifts donated by the pharaoh for Abutiu's funeral was discovered by Egyptologist George A. Reisner in October 1935. It was apparently part of the spoil material incorporated into the structure of a Sixth Dynasty mastaba (pharaonic-era tomb) after the demolition of the funerary chapel belonging to Abutiu's owner, where the stone likely had originally been installed. The white limestone tablet measures 54.2 × 28.2 × 23.2 cm (21.3 × 11.1 × 9.1 in). The inscription is composed of ten vertical rows of hieroglyphs, separated by vertical lines.

Abutiu appears to have been a sighthound, a lightly built hunting dog similar to a greyhound, with erect ears and a curly tail. The tomb in which his tablet was discovered is in Cemetery G 2100 in Giza West Field, close to the western side of the Great Pyramid of Giza.

== Background ==
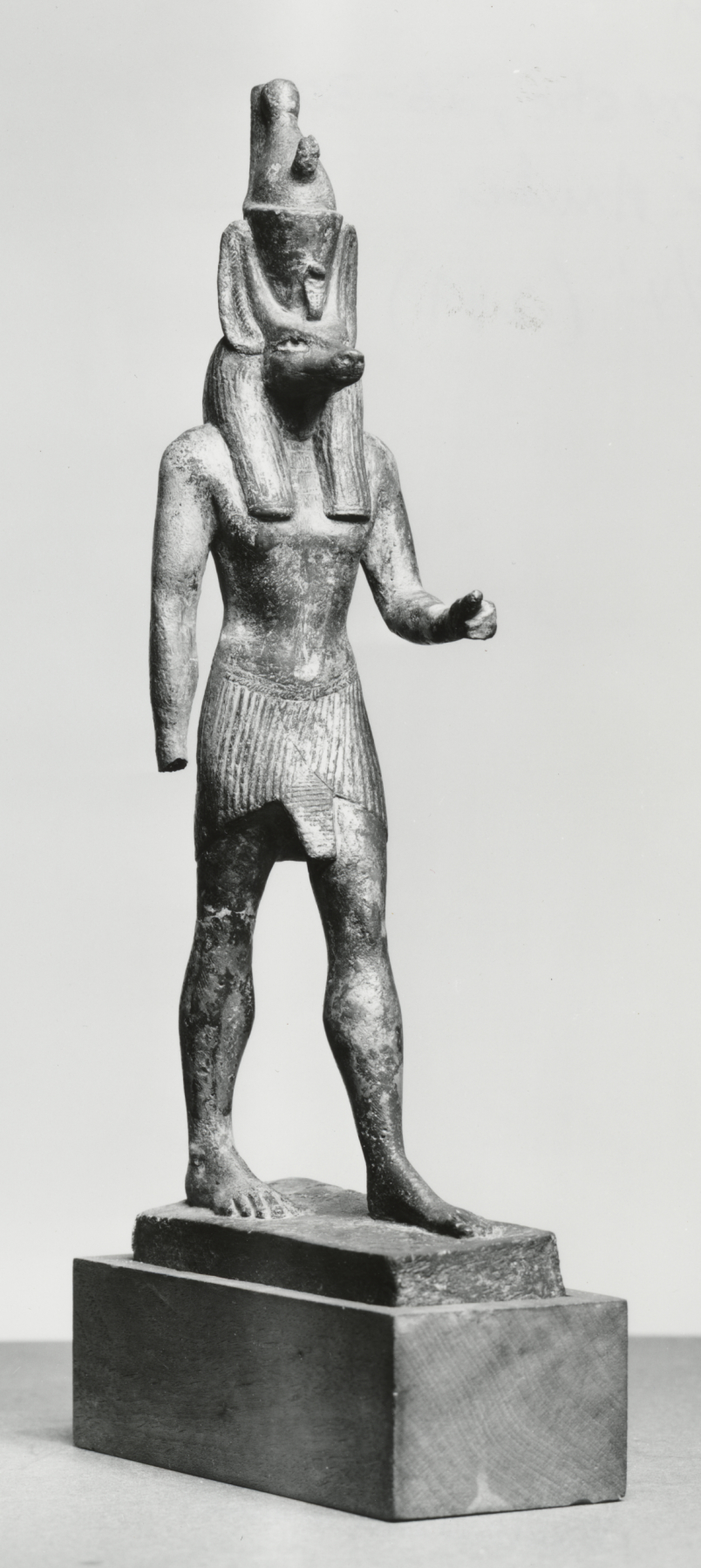
Statue of Anubis, dated to the mid 7th to mid 4th century BC

Herodotus documents that in ancient Persia dogs were protected animals, held in the highest esteem during their lifetime. According to the ancient Greeks, dogs in ancient Egypt were treated with the same respect as they were in Persia, and were commonly mummified after death before being buried in family tombs. The ancient Egyptians and others of the Near East believed that dogs were spiritual beings, similar to humans, and they were "often associated with particular deities and the powers they wield". A number of the early dynastic royal burial grounds contain the graves of dogs, along with women and servants of the royal household. Ashkelon cemetery in the Southern District of Israel is perhaps the best-documented dog cemetery in the ancient world, but dog mummies have been unearthed en masse in sites across Egypt including Rhoda in Upper Egypt, Thebes, Abydos, and near Maghagha.

The ancient Egyptians mummified many animal species, from cats and gazelles to crocodiles, baboons, and birds. Typically, many animal species were consumed as meat after death, but it is highly unlikely that dogs would have been eaten. Radiographs of exhumed dogs in the ancient world have revealed that the mummification process involved wrapping the embalmed bones together with bandages and placing them within a wooden statue of Anubis, the jackal-headed deity associated with mummification and the afterlife in ancient Egyptian religion.

== Discovery ==
The only source from which Abutiu is known is a stone inscription tablet that may have come from the funerary chapel of the dog's owner. The tablet was apparently among spolia used to build another grave in approximately 2280 BC, a sixth-Dynasty mastaba, after the chapel's demolition. It was discovered on 13 October 1935 by Egyptologist George A. Reisner during a joint Harvard University-Boston Museum of Fine Arts expedition, and removed from the site four days later.

The find was recorded by the main expedition photographer, Mohammedani Ibrahim, who took more than 9,321 large-format glass-plate images on Reisner's expeditions. The tablet is now held by the Egyptian Museum in Cairo (inventory number JE 67573).

Neither the dog's grave nor mummy has been recovered. The tomb in which the tablet was unearthed is in Cemetery G 2100 in Giza West Field, close to the western side of the Great Pyramid of Giza. The white limestone tablet measures 54.2 × 28.2 × 23.2 cm (21.3 × 11.1 × 9.1 in) and is inscribed with ten vertical rows of hieroglyphs, separated from each other by vertical lines. Part of a leash is visible on the upper-right corner, suggesting that the tablet displayed an image of Abutiu with his owner. Abutiu appears to have been a sighthound, a lightly built hunting dog similar to a greyhound, with erect ears and a curly tail.

The text of the inscription translated by Reisner describes the gifts offered by the pharaoh in tribute at Abutiu's funeral:

"The dog which was the guard of His Majesty, Abutiu is his name. His Majesty ordered that he be buried (ceremonially), that he be given a coffin from the royal treasury, fine linen in great quantity, (and) incense. His Majesty (also) gave perfumed ointment, and (ordered) that a tomb be built for him by the gangs of masons. His Majesty did this for him in order that he (the dog) might be Honoured (before the great god, Anubis)."

== Interpretation ==
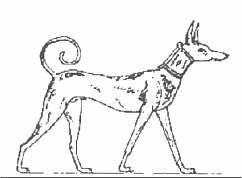
Image of a Tesem dog from the grave of Intef II, c. 2065 BC

Although it was common to bury dogs in ancient Egypt, the funeral of Abutiu was unusually elaborate, an honour normally reserved for upper-class humans. The pharaoh's gifts suggest that the corpse was mummified, as was commonly done with humans at the time, in the belief that the Ka (Egyptian soul) of the dead would enter into its afterlife through the ceremonial burial.

Although no images of Abutiu have been found, the text characterizes him as ṯzm (Tesem), a lightly built hunting dog similar to a greyhound, with erect ears and a curly tail. The Tesem dog features in predynastic depictions, making it one of the oldest known breeds of dog, and images of it are common throughout Ancient Egyptian history. According to Reisner, the name Abuwtiyuw is not fully translatable, but he surmised that ꜥbw ("abuw") is an onomatopoeic representation of a dog's bark, as this component often is found in Ancient Egyptian dog names. Edward C. Martin Jr. claims that the name means 'With Pointed Ears', which would fit the description of the Tesem.

== See also ==
- Africanis
- List of individual dogs
