= Pentulive =

Yle Areena's live television programme featuring dogs

- Genre: Slow tv
- Created by: Pirjo Koskinen
- Original language: Finnish
- No. of seasons: 6

Production
- Producer: Jyri Loikkanen
- Running time: 8 weeks/season

Original release
- Network: Yle
- Release: 22 November 2021 – 20 December 2026

Pentulive (lit. 'Puppy Live') is a Finnish live TV programme broadcast on Yle Areena. The live streams are broadcast 8 weeks per season. The programme consists of the mother and a few puppies born a few days later. It has been descriped as slow TV with aspects of social media streaming due to its light nature.

Experts have emphasised how different the broadcast is from media that produces doomscrolling and how particularly in Finland it is a valuable tool to survive cold winters. Viewers have too highlighted the broadcast as a relaxing break and a way to take their minds off everyday problems.

== History ==
Pentulive was born in 2021 out of a desire to increase the understanding of modern canine science and the true nature of the first few weeks of a dog's life. The show has proven to be popular. According to Yle the show has become more popular year after year with the most recent season, as of October 2026, having reached over a million viewers.

In October 2026 the Swedish public broadcaster SVT began showing the Finnish broadcast and on the 15th of October Yle announced format rights had been exported to the Netherlands. During the third week of the month the show also began garnering increasing international attention from major news outlets such as The Times and CNN, which has led to increases in nightime viewership. Finnish news outlet Helsingin Sanomat described the phenomena on the 22nd as a torrent, which had been set off the preceding Sunday.

== Seasons ==
The first season was streamed 22 November 2021 – 21 January 2022 and it featured a litter of Labrador Retrievers. Akka, the mother, gave birth to nine puppies 2 days later, on 24 November 2021.

The second season was streamed 1 November – 28 December 2022 and it featured a litter of Shiba Inus. Möpsö, the mother, gave birth to three puppies 2 days later, on 3 November 2022.

The third season was streamed 29 September – 26 November 2023, featured a litter of Whippets. Sini, the mother, gave birth to six puppies 2 days later, on 1 October 2023.

The fourth season was streamed 25 October –19 December 2024 and it featured a litter of Border Collies. Loimu, the mother, gave birth to ten puppies 2 days later, on 27 October 2024. Since 8 November 2024, Yle introduced 4 Pentulive minigames such as: Kynsienleikkuu (Nail clipping), Punnitus (Weighing), Pentukaaos (Puppy chaos) and Lammaspaimen (Shepherd).

The fifth season was streamed 14 October – 14 December 2025 and it featured the English Springer Spaniel. Muru, the mother, gave birth to eleven puppies on the same day.

The sixth season started on 6 October 2026 and it features the Lagotto Romagnolo. Hilkka, the mother, gave birth to six puppies 4 days later, on 10 October 2026.

No.	Air date	Breed	Mother	Puppies	Sources
1	22 November 2021 – 21 January 2022	Labrador Retriever	Akka	Nine puppies: Allo, Galle, Arvo, Iisakki, Vinski, Ykä, Floora, Aada, Lyyti	
2	1 November 2022 – 28 December 2022	Shiba Inu	Möpsö	Three puppies: Ruska, Piki, Roihu	
3	29 September 2023 – 26 November 2023	Whippet	Sini	Six puppies: Into, Eloisa, Wauhti, Tuuli, Puhti, Huima	
4	25 October 2024 – 19 December 2024	Border Collie	Loimu	Ten puppies: Tuike, Säde, Välke, Kipinä, Salama, Rusko, Hämy, Pilke, Kulo, Tähti	
5	14 October 2025 – 14 December 2025	English Springer Spaniel	Muru	Eleven puppies: Tatti, Lakka, Myrsky, Kaste, Havu, Puro, Tuisku, Hanki, Tupru, Sumu, Kuura	
6	6 October 2026 – 20 December 2026	Lagotto Romagnolo	Hilkka	Six puppies: Bella, Pepe, Dante, Luna, Enzo, Milo	

== Minigames ==
Pentulive minigames were introduced on 8 November 2024. Here's the list of Pentulive minigames. Since 16 January 2025, all points from the minigames have been cleared.

Name	Release date	Rules
Kynsienleikkuu (Nail clipping)	8 November 2024	The minigame consists of 3 levels, ranging from a simple nail-clipping level to a difficult level, where the puppy's hand starts shaking. The game ends when the player gets all 5 strikes or has cleared all 3 levels.
Punnitus (Weighing)	22 November 2024	The minigame consists of 10 levels. The player must weigh the puppy and prevent the puppy from running away. If the puppy runs away, no points will be awarded to the player, finishing the game with less points. The game ends when the player has cleared all 10 levels.
Pentukaaos (Puppy chaos)	5 December 2024	The player must calm down the puppies by cleaning, giving the bone or a toy. The game ends when the meter is filled or the player puts all puppies to sleep.
Lammaspaimen (Shepherd)	18 December 2024	The game consists of 3 levels. The player (controlling as a shepherd) must get the puppy to a safe home. The game ends when the player clears all 3 levels.

=== Puppylive Guesser ===
For the 2026 season Yle released a Puppylive Guesser minigame, where players bet on what the puppies will do on the stream. The minigame is playable in Finnish, Swedish and English on the Yle mobile application on Android and IOS.

== Notes ==
1.The stream started earlier than expected, as Muru showed clear signs of impending birth. The stream was originally supposed to start on 15 October 2025.
