= African village dog =

Type of dog

African Village Dog
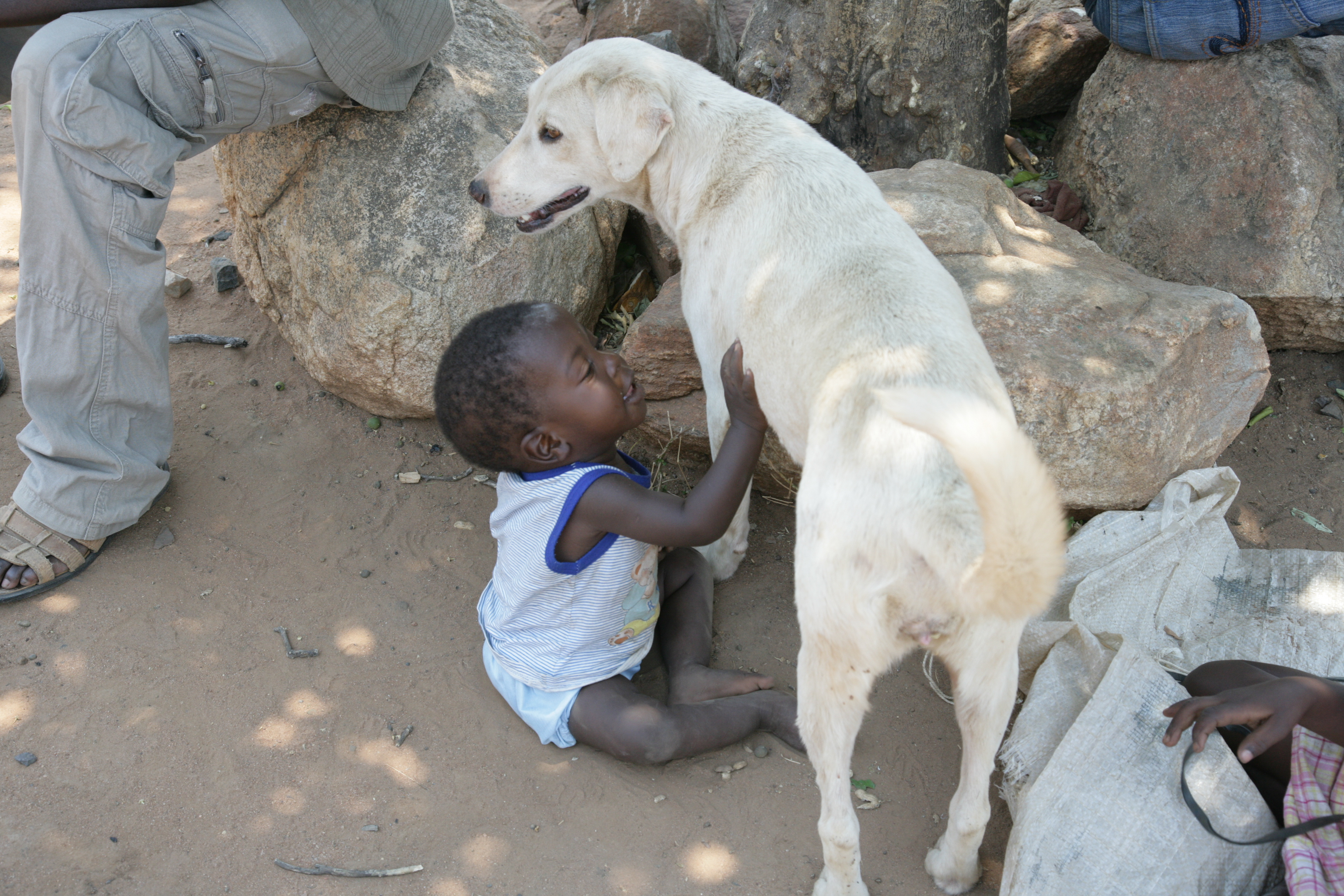
- Picture of a local dog in Malawi
- Other names: Africanis (Southern Africa); Avuvi (Togo, Ghana); Azawakh (Sahel)
- Breed status: Not recognised as a breed by any major kennel club.

African village dogs are a genetically diverse group of indigenous dogs found in Africa. They descend from ancient dogs that arrived in Africa from the Middle East. African village dogs specifically were not formally bred, unlike other dogs from Africa. Only one is currently standardized, the Basenji, with the others remaining as landraces, not registered breeds.

== Middle Eastern origins ==
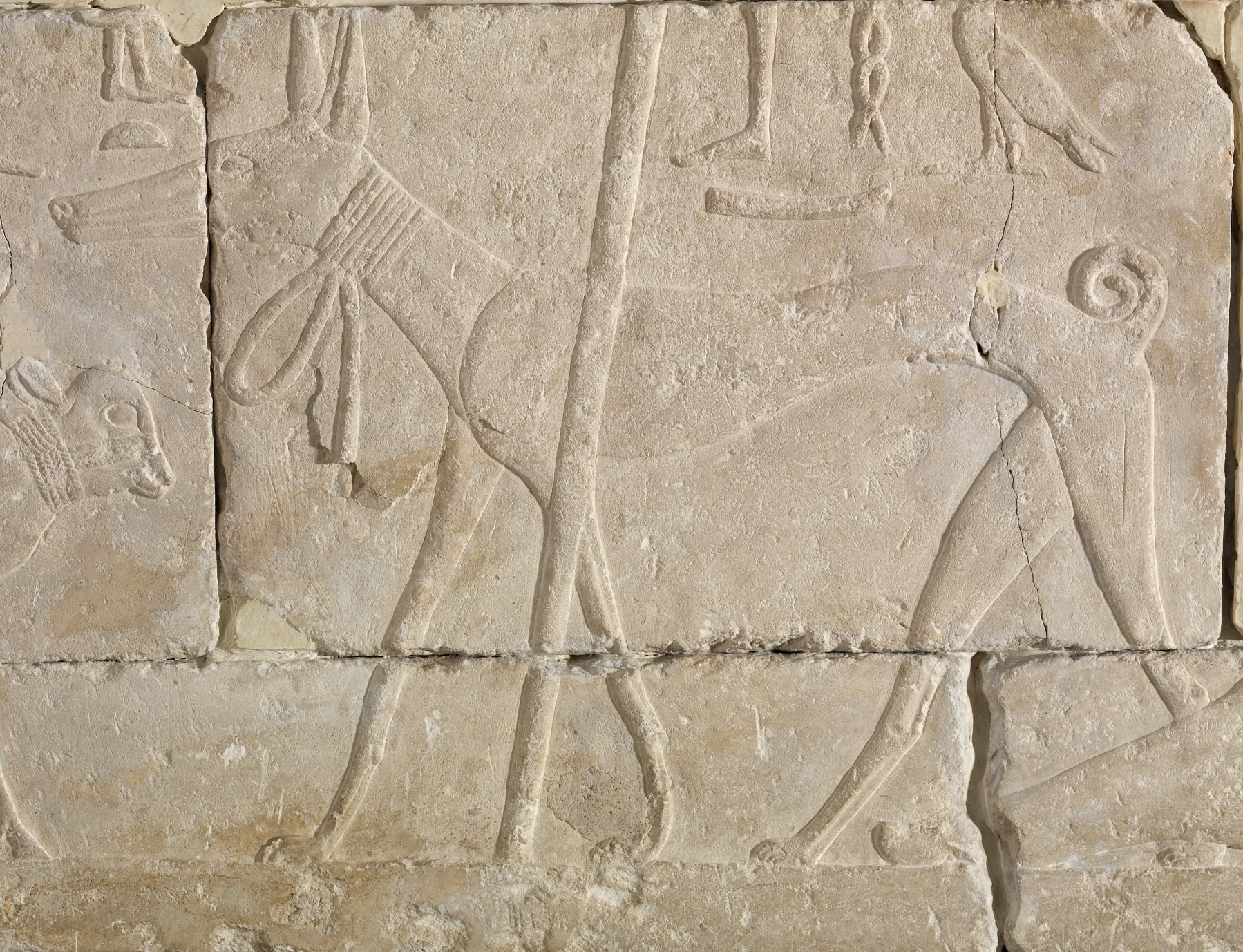
Dogs first entered Africa through Egypt with evidence dating to 5,900 years ago (image from 2400 BC).

The oldest dog remains to be found in Africa date 5,900 years before present (YBP) and were discovered at the Merimde Beni-Salame Neolithic site in the Nile Delta, Egypt. The next oldest remains date 5,500 YBP and were found at Esh Shareinab on the Nile in Sudan. This suggests that the dog arrived from Asia at the same time as domestic sheep and goats. The dog then spread north and south throughout Africa beside livestock herders, with remains found in archaeological sites dated 925–1,055 YBP at Ntusi in Uganda, dated 950–1,000 YBP at Kalomo in Zambia, and then at sites south of the Limpopo River and into southern Africa.

== Genetic diversity ==
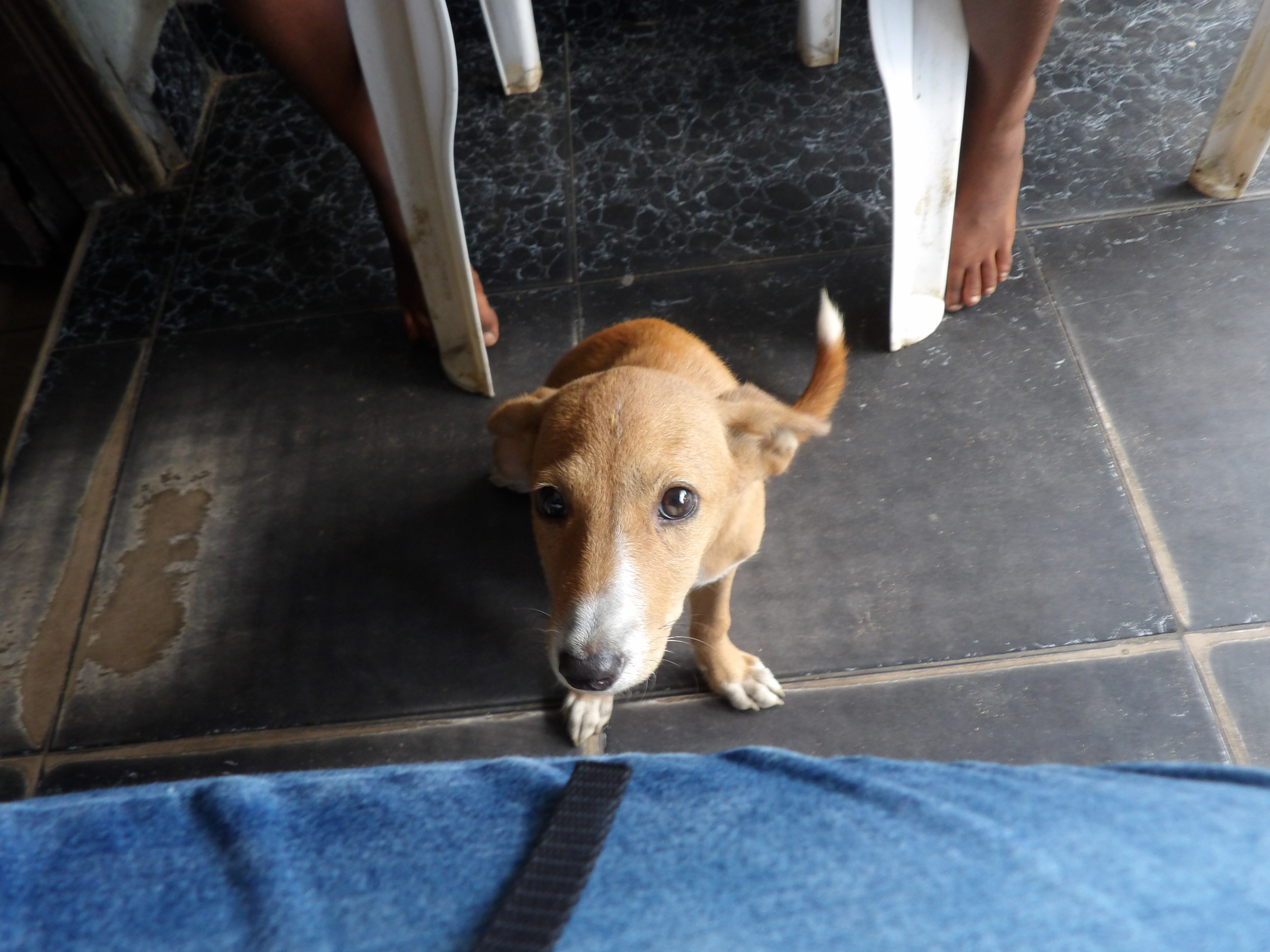
An African Village Dog found in Port Harcourt, Rivers, Nigeria

In 2009, a genetic study of African village dogs found that these were genetically distinct from the non-native and mixed-breed dogs. The village dogs of Africa were a mosaic of native dogs that arrived early into Africa, and non-native mixed breed dogs. The Basenji clustered with the indigenous dogs, but the Pharaoh Hound and the Rhodesian Ridgeback were predominantly of non-African origin.

== Landraces ==
There are different types of African village dogs:

- Avuvi: a pariah-type village dog from Ghana and Togo.
- Baganda Dog: a Lurcher-like large game hunting dog from Uganda, named after the Baganda nation.
- Bagirmi Dog: a large dog with piebald colour, named after the Baguirmi Department of Chad.
- Cameroon Dog: a hunting dog from West Africa, of medium size and primitive type, with erect ears, long legs and short coat, often piebald in colour, named after Cameroon.
- East African Dog: a hunting dog from Kenya, large in size.
- Hahoawu: a "clean" medium-sized (11 to 14 kg) watch dog from Togo, with a far sight and a coat of fawn or red colour, well adapted to city life, named after the Haho river.
- Liberian Dog (a.k.a. Liberian Terrier): a terrier-like dog from West Africa, small and reddish-brown, named after Liberia.
- Madagascar Hunting Dog: a hunting dog from Madagascar.
- Manboutou Dog: a local variant of the Nyam Nyam kept by the Mangbetu nation of the Democratic Republic of the Congo.
- Nyam Nyam (a.k.a. Zande Dog): a small hunting dog from Central Africa with erect ears, a curly tail and a short coat of fawn colour, thought to be similar or somehow related to the Basenji, named after the Zande nation.
- Nkita (a.k.a. Kare, Ekuke): a slim, mixed Nigerian breed of dog, often brown or tan with erect ears; they are often used by farmers.
- Simaku: a ratter from South Africa, also used for cleaning yards (by scavenging waste), developed by crossing pariah dogs with terriers.
- Sudan Greyhound: an extinct hare-hunting dog from Sudan.
- West African Mouse Dog: an extinct small (36 cm) Doberman Pinscher-like ratter, with a short, smooth and red coat.
- Zulu Dog: a small guard and hunting dog with a square muzzle and a fawn coat, named after the Zulu nation.

Moreover, it is debatable whether the following breeds also belong or belonged to "African village dogs".

- African Hairless Dog: a probably extinct hairless dog.
- Bisharin Greyhound: a hare-hunting dog from Sudan, with erect ears and a curly tail, named after the Bishari nation.
- Dinka Greyhound: a Greyhound-like pariah hunting dog from Sudan, of a rougher type than the other Sudanese breeds, with a short, fawn coat, named after the Dinka nation.
- Egyptian Hairless Dog: an extinct hairless dog, close relative or perhaps even the same breed as the African Hairless Dog, small in size (41 cms), with drooping ears.
- Shilluk Greyhound (a.k.a. Shilluk Dog): an antelope-hunting dog with a robust body and semi-erect (folded) ears, usually of red colour with a black mask, named after the Shilluk nation.
- Zanzibar Greyhound (a.k.a. Zanzibar Dog): a large (68 cms) hunting dog from Zanzibar, with erect ears, a robust body and a red-white colour, believed to be developed by crossing Salukis with pariah dogs.

== See also ==
- Africanis
- Basenji
- Free-ranging dog
