= George Andrew Reisner =

American archeologist (1867–1942)

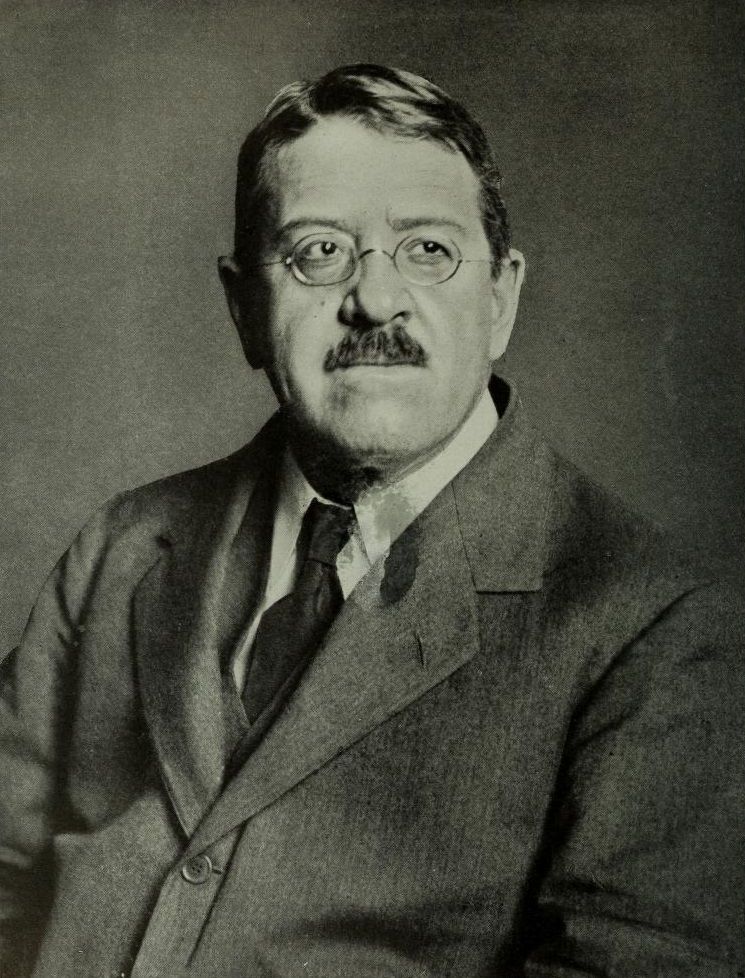
- Born: George Andrew Reisner Jr. November 5, 1867; Indianapolis, Indiana, U.S.
- Died: June 6, 1942 (aged 74); Giza, Egypt
- Occupation: Archeologist

George Andrew Reisner Jr. (November 5, 1867 – June 6, 1942) was an American archeologist of Ancient Egypt, Nubia and Palestine.

== Early life ==
Reisner was born on November 5, 1867, in Indianapolis. His parents were George Andrew Reisner Sr. and Mary Elizabeth Mason. His father's parents were of German descent.

== Academic career ==
Reisner began his studies at Harvard University in 1885. There he gained a B.A. degree in 1889, followed by a M.A. in 1891 and a Ph.D. in Semitic Languages in 1893. With the support of his advisor, assyriologist David Gordon Lyon, he became a traveling fellow and started postdoctoral work in Berlin for three years. In Germany, Reisner studied hieroglyphics with Kurt Sethe and turned towards Egyptology as his main field.

Reisner was elected to the American Academy of Arts and Sciences in 1914 and the American Philosophical Society in 1940.

In 1889, Reisner was head football coach at Purdue University, coaching for one season and compiling a record of 2–1.

== Archaeology career ==
On his return from Germany in 1899, Reisner organized his first archaeological expedition to Egypt (1899–1905), funded by philanthropist Phoebe Hearst. In subsequent seasons, he excavated the Middle Kingdom sites of Deir el-Ballas and El-Ahaiwah, where he developed an archaeological methodology that characterized his work from that moment on.

In 1902, permission to excavate the Western cemetery in Giza was granted by Gaston Maspero, director of the Egyptian Antiquities Service. The area was divided into three sections, and chosen by lot. The southern section was given to the Italians under Ernesto Schiaparelli, the northern strip to the Germans under Ludwig Borchardt, and the middle section to Andrew Reisner. He met Queen Marie of Romania in Giza. During this first expedition, Reisner gathered and catalogued approximately 17.000 objects.

In 1907, Reisner was hired by the British occupation government in Egypt to conduct an emergency survey in northern Nubia in response to potential damage of archaeological sites during the construction of the Aswan Low Dam. There, he developed a still-in-use chronology that divided the earliest history of Ancient Nubia according to four successive cultural groups that he named Group A, Group B, Group C, and Group X (although the term "group B" has fallen into disuse).

After a decade in Egypt, Reisner headed the Harvard excavation of Samaria, first in 1908 together with Gottlieb Schumacher, and for a second time in 1910, when he discovered written documents testifying the presence of an Egyptian population in 8th century BCE Palestina.

In 1910, he was appointed Curator of Egyptian Art at Boston Museum of Fine Arts and in 1911 Resiner and his family traveled back to America, where he reassumed teaching at Harvard. In 1913, Reisner was tasked with training the young archaeologist O.G.S. Crawford in excavation techniques, Crawford was later to warmly recall that Reisner was "an excavator of the first rank". Soon after, he organized the joint expedition Harvard-Boston. Between 1913 and 1916 excavations were conducted in the ancient site of Kerma (Nubia). He also excavated two cemeteries at Jebel Moya, encouraged by the director of the team leading the diggings there, Sir Wellcome.

=== Contributions to archaeology ===
From 1919 to 1921, Reisner excavated the sites of Jebel Barkal (The Holy Mountain), el-Kurru and Meroe in Nubia. Upon his studies at Jebel Barkal, he found the Nubian kings were not buried in the pyramids but outside of them. His studies in the Pyramid field of el-Kurru led him to reconsider the role of this royal cemetery, where kings of the 25th dynasty of Egypt were buried. The chronology of the tombs that he developed and the interpretations that followed have been more recently disregarded as erroneous.

Reisner found the skull of a Nubian female (who he thought was a king) which is in the collection of the Peabody Museum of Archaeology and Ethnology at Harvard. Reisner believed that Kerma was originally the base of an Egyptian governor and that these Egyptian rulers evolved into the independent monarchs of Kerma. He also created a list of Egyptian viceroys of Kush. He found the tomb of Queen Hetepheres I, the mother of King Khufu (Cheops in Greek) who built the Great Pyramid at Giza. During this time he also explored mastabas. Arthur Merton (London Times) remarked in 1936 in the aftermath of the Abuwtiyuw discovery that Reisner "enjoys an unrivalled position not only as the outstanding figure in present-day Egyptology, but also as a man whose soundness of judgement and extensive general knowledge are widely conceded."

Although Reisner was not the first to acknowledge the importance of stratigraphy in archaeological excavations, he was one of the first archaeologists to apply it during his excavations in Egypt and develop the methodological principles. Previously, only Flinders Petrie had paid some serious attention to this technique in his book Methods and Aims in Archaeology. Reisner took care on identifying different stratigraphic deposits and removing them layer by layer. He insisted on the importance of recording every discovery in order to provide comprehensive interpretations of a site, taking into account the debris and minor artifacts. In this sense, he distanced himself from the work of previous excavators, whose approaches were more similar to those of treasure hunters. Reisner advanced a theory of stratigraphy in an appendix of his manual Archaeological Fieldwork in Egypt: A Method of Historical Research, published posthumously.

=== Views on Ancient Nubia ===
Reisner's views on Nubia were conditioned by the theoretical ideas of his own time, many of which were based on contemporary considerations about the progress and decline of cultures. From his perspective, the subsequent stages of Nubia civilization were the result of the influx of external peoples that migrated into the country. He deemed the local black populations incapable of the artistic or architectural achievements he faced during his excavations. He postulated the Egyptian origins of the Kushite culture since they were considered somewhat closer to the Caucasian stock. Modern scholarship has recently disregarded these ideas, emphasizing the many links between Ancient Egypt and Ancient Nubia and even advancing the statement that Nubia had a strong influence over Egypt, especially during prehistoric and early historical times.

== Timeline ==
- 1897–1899: Classified Egyptology collection of the Egyptian Museum in Cairo
- 1899–1905: Led the Hearst Expedition of the University of California to explore burial grounds at and around Qift
- 1905: Edited The Hearst Medical Papyrus
- 1905–1914: Assistant professor of Egyptology at Harvard University
- 1907–1909: Directed archaeological survey of Nubia (Nilotic Sudan) for Egyptian government
- 1910–1942: Curator of Egyptian collections at the Boston Museum of Fine Arts
- 1914–1942: Professor of Egyptology at Harvard University
- 1916: Discovers in Jebel Barkal, in two separate caches, hard stone statues, representing Taharqa and four of his five successors: Tanwetamani, Senkamanisken, Anlamani, and Aspelta
- 1916–1923: Explored pyramids of Meroë, dug out temple at Napata
- 1931: Wrote Mycerinus (alternative name of Menkaure)
- 1942: Published final work, A History of the Giza Necropolis

== Personal life ==
Reisner married Mary Putnam Bronson, with whom he had a daughter, also called Mary.

== Published works ==
- Amulets. Cairo: Impr. de l'Institut français d'archéologie orientale. 1907. (reprint ISBN 978-1-57898-718-4)
- Early dynastic cemeteries of Naga-ed-Dêr. Leipzig: J. C. Hinrichs. 1908.
- The Egyptian conception of immortality. Cambridge: The Riverside Press (Houghton Mifflin). 1912.
- Excavations at Kerma. Cambridge: Peabody Museum of Harvard University. 1923. (reprint ISBN 0-527-01028-6)
- Harvard excavations at Samaria, 1908-1910. Cambridge: Harvard University Press. 1924. (with Clarence Stanley Fisher and David Gordon Lyon)
- Mycerinus, the temples of the third pyramid at Giza. Cambridge: Harvard University Press. 1931.
- The development of the Egyptian tomb down to the accession of Cheops. Cambridge: Harvard University Press. 1936.
- A history of the Giza Necropolis. Cambridge: Harvard University Press. 1942.
- Canopics. Cairo: Impr. de l'Institut français d'archéologie orientale. 1967. (completed by Mohammad Hassan Abd-ul-Rahman)
- Archaeological Fieldwork in Egypt: A Method of Historical Research. Albany: The Ancient Egyptian Heritage and Archaeology Fund, 2020. (edited Peter Lacovara, Sue D’Auria, and Jonathan P. Elias, originally written in 1924 and submitted for publication in 1937)

== Head coaching record ==
Year	Team	Overall	Conference	Standing	Bowl/playoffs
Purdue (Independent) (1889)
1889	Purdue	2–1			
Purdue:		2–1			
Total:		2–1			
