= Africanis =

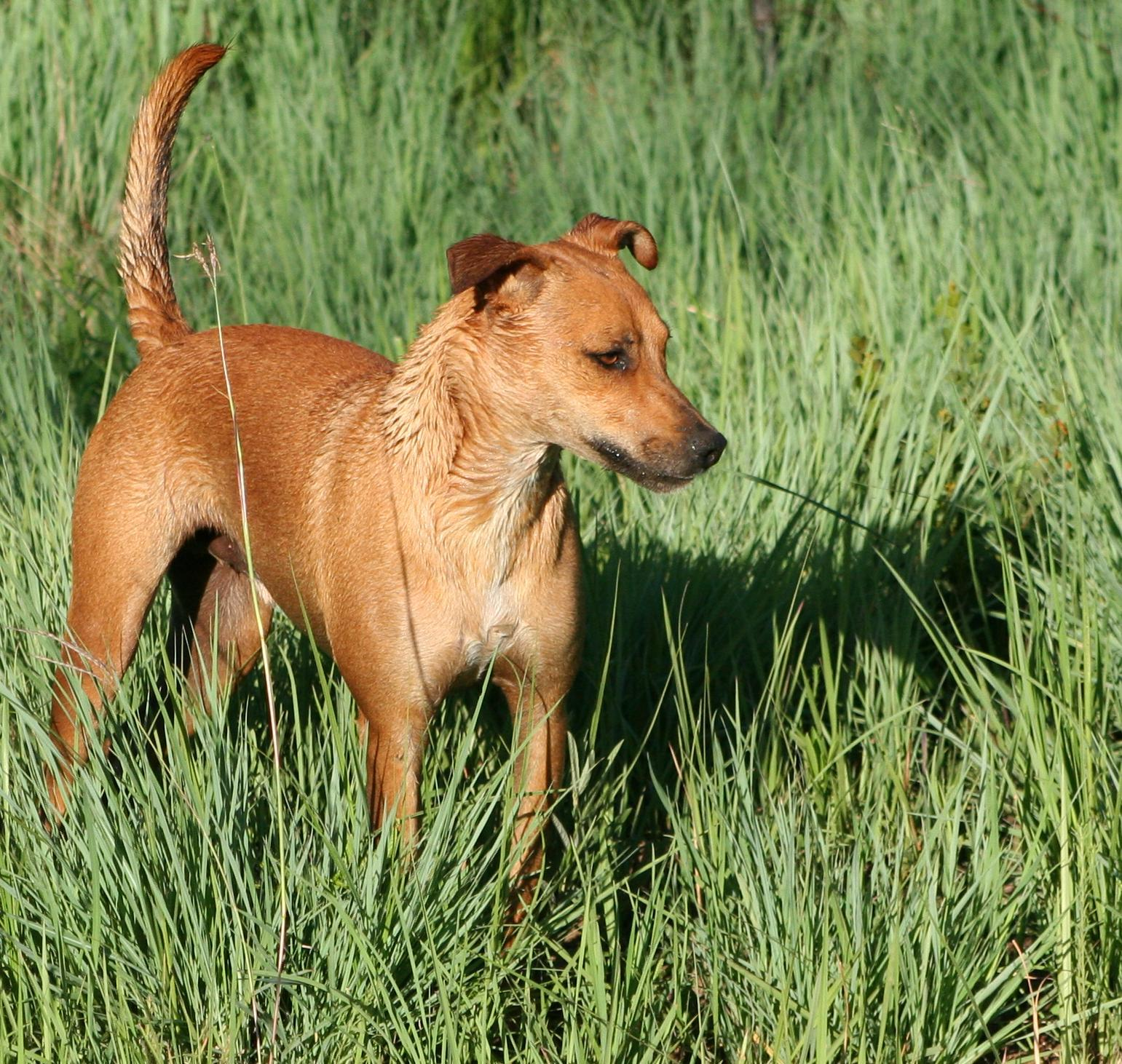
- Africanis
- Other names: African dog Mutina dog Khoekhoe dog Xhosa dog Tswana dog Sotho dog Zulu Dog; Katali; Bhoki; Kutu; Mukehe; Bobby; Simba; Sibbi; Lokasie-hond; Spoti; Bosco (Kenyan slang name)
- Origin: Southern Africa
Traits
- Height: 50–62 cm (20–24 in)
- Coat: Short and compact
- Colour: All colours or combinations of colours, particularly brown, brindle, black or white
- Litter size: 2-8

The Africanis is a dog landrace found across southern Africa. It is a medium-sized, short-coated dog, with a distinctive black patch around the front of the muzzle.

== Description ==
Africanis dogs resting in the grass and enjoying the sun.

As is typical with landraces, there are several regional variations, believed to be the result of isolation and, to a limited degree, deliberate breeding. Some modern writers describe the Africanis as a pariah dog. This is considered an inappropriate classification, as the term typically denotes an ownerless, free-ranging dog. Considered a landrace with limited human interference in their breeding, the Africanis has also been maintained by human owners.

The Africanis is a medium-sized, lightly built dog with a long slender muzzle and, usually a short coat. It has been described as resembling a cross between a Greyhound, a terrier and a dingo. It can be found in almost any colour or combination of colours, although fawns, browns, brindles and blacks with various white markings are common. A distinctive, possibly primitive, feature is a black patch found high on the outside of the tail where the caudal gland is found in the wild wolf.

The Africanis usually stands between 50 and 62 centimetres (20 and 24 in). Being a landrace, minor variations in appearance may be common. The Africanis is nonetheless known to breed true to a recognisable form.

== History ==
Africa's indigenous dogs descended from ancient Egyptian dogs found throughout the Nile Delta around 5,900 years ago. (Note: The oldest dog remains found in Africa date 5,900 years before present (YBP) and were discovered at the Merimde Beni-Salame Neolithic site in the Nile Delta, Egypt. The next oldest remains date 5,500 YBP and were found at Esh Shareinab on the Nile in Sudan. This suggests that the dog arrived from Asia at the same time as domestic sheep and goats. The dog then spread from north to south down Africa beside livestock herders, with remains found in archaeological sites dated 925–1,055 YBP at Ntusi in Uganda, dated 950–1,000 YBP at Kalomo in Zambia, and then at sites south of the Limpopo River and into southern Africa. Archaeologists working in Africa have difficulty distinguishing ancient domestic dog remains from those of jackals, there are only a few distinguishing skeletal parts and those diagnostic parts are not always preserved.) It is believed the descendants of these dogs spread throughout Africa with population migrations, first throughout the Sahara and finally reaching southern Africa around the 6th century AD. (Note: The earliest skeletal remains of dogs in southern Africa were found at archaeological sites in Limpopo Province, South Africa and date from around 570 AD.)

The Africanis has always been attached to human settlements in southern Africa. The dogs have been used to help herd sheep, goats and cattle, guard against predators and help their human companions in the hunt. The Africanis is known by a number of names. These include the Kasi dog, mbwa wa ki-tamaduni ("traditional dog" in Kiswahili), the Khoikhoi dog, the Tswana dog and the Zulu dog. Other local names include Sica, Isiqha, umhuqa, umgodoyi, Ixhalaga, Ixalagha, Isigola, I-Twina, and Itiwina.

While generally looked down upon by European settlers who preferred their imported dog breeds, the Africanis was held in higher esteem by Europeans in Africa than the Indian pariah dog was in India.

Efforts have been made to protect, preserve and promote these dogs, and prevent them from being split into a number of different breeds based upon different distinguishing physical features. In South Africa, a society was established in 1998 to preserve the Africanis, the Africanis Society of Southern Africa.

The name Africanis is a portmanteau of the words "Africa" and "canis".

== Temperament ==
The Africanis is described as affectionate, intelligent, and gentle. They are said to have a natural desire to please their owners, which makes them easy to train, and to respond best to positive reinforcement training. They are also described as being good with children and as good family pets. However, they do display watchful, territorial behaviour.

== See also ==
- List of dog breeds
- African village dog
- Basenji
