= Basenji =

Central African breed of dog

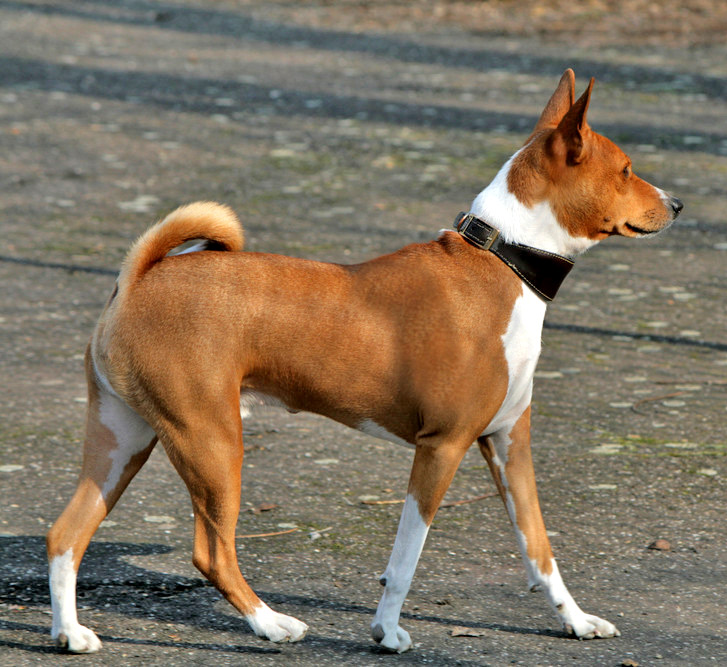
- Other names: African bush dog; African barkless dog; Ango angari; Congo dog; Zande dog
- Origin: Democratic Republic of the Congo
Traits
Height	Males	43 cm (17 in)
	Females	40 cm (16 in)
Weight	Males	11 kg (24 lb)
	Females	9.5 kg (21 lb)
- Coat: short and fine
Kennel club standards
- Fédération Cynologique Internationale: standard

The Basenji (/bəˈsɛndʒi/) is a breed of hunting dog created from stock that originated in Central Africa, including in the Republic of the Congo and other adjacent tropical African countries. The Fédération Cynologique Internationale places it in the Spitz and "primitive types" categories, while the American Kennel Club classifies it as a hound. The breed does not bark in the traditional manner of most dogs, rather vocalising in an unusual, yodel-like "talking" sound, due to its unusually-shaped larynx. This trait earns the Basenji its nickname of "barkless" dog, a similar feature seen and heard in the New Guinea singing dog.

== Name ==
In Swahili, mbwa shenzi translates to "savage dog". Another local name is m'bwa m'kube, 'mbwa wa mwitu "wild dog", or "dog that jumps up and down", a reference to their tendency to jump straight up to spot their quarry.

The dogs are also known to the Azande of South Sudan as ango angari.

== Lineage ==
The Basenji has been identified as a basal breed that predates the emergence of the modern breeds in the 19th century. DNA studies based on whole-genome sequences indicate that the Basenji and the dingo are both considered to be basal members of the domestic dog clade.

In 2021, the genome of two Basenjis were assembled, which indicated that the Basenji fell within the Asian spitz group. The AMY2B gene produces an enzyme, amylase, that helps to digest starch. The wolf, the husky and the dingo possess only two copies of this gene, which provides evidence that they arose before the expansion of agriculture. The genomic study found that similarly, the Basenji possesses only two copies of this gene.

== History ==
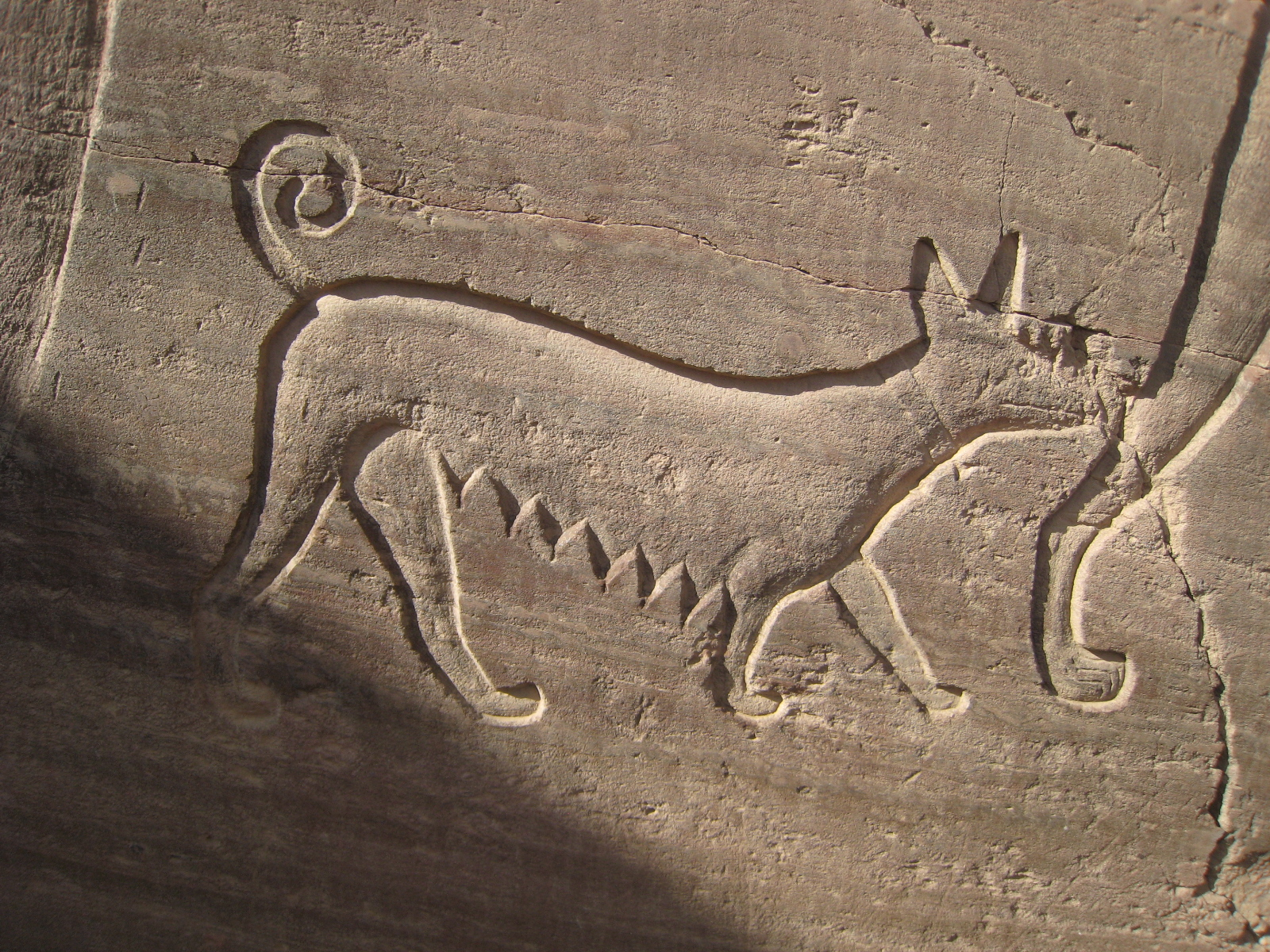
An Egyptian Tesem

The Basenji originated on the continent of Africa, where it has been identified with Egyptian depictions of dogs with curled tails and erect ears, a breed called Tesem which is found in murals as old as 4,500 years.

Edwards et al (2021) suggest that the Basenji made its first appearance in the western world in the mid 19th century and in support of this argue that a painting by Thomas Musgrave Joy (1812–66) entitled Three Dogs dated 1843 belonging to Queen Victoria includes a dog that is clearly a Basenji. The dog in question was brought back from the Niger expedition of 1841.

Several attempts were made to introduce the breed into England, but the earliest imports succumbed to disease. In 1923 six Basenjis were taken from Sudan, but all six died from distemper shots received in quarantine. It was not until the 1930s that foundation stock was successfully established in England, and then in the United States by animal importer Henry Trefflich. It is likely that nearly all the Basenjis in the Western world are descended from these few original imports. The breed was officially accepted into the AKC in 1943. In 1990, the AKC stud book was reopened to 14 new imports at the request of the Basenji Club of America. The stud book was reopened again to selected imported dogs from 1 January 2009 to 31 December 2013. An American-led expedition collected breeding stock in villages in the Basankusu area of the Democratic Republic of Congo, in 2010.

The popularity of the Basenji in the United States, according to the American Kennel Club, has declined over the past decade, with the breed ranked 71st in 1999, decreasing to 84th in 2006, and to 93rd in 2011. As of 2024, the breed's rank has gone up to 80th.

== Characteristics ==
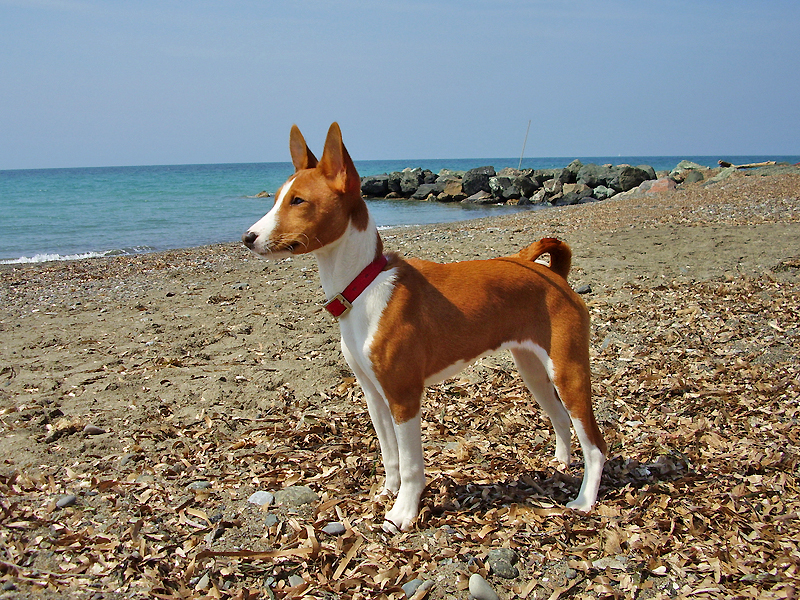
Red with white markings

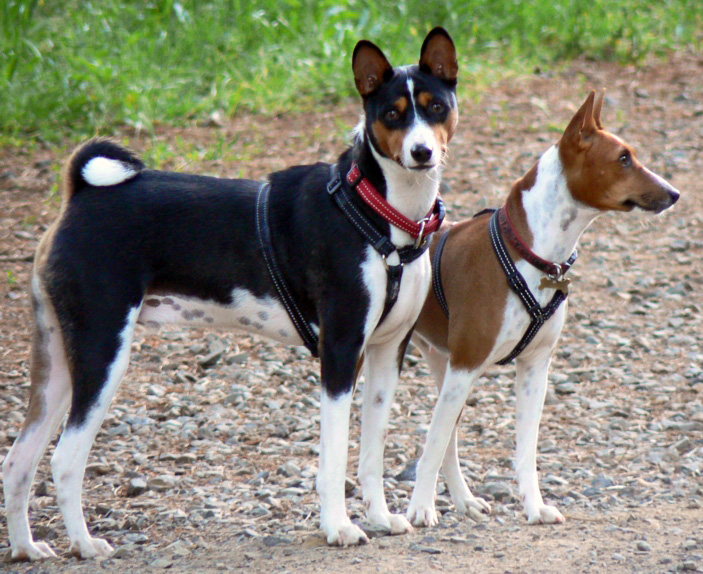
A tricolour dog (left) and a red bitch (right)

The Basenji is a small, short-haired dog with erect ears, a tightly curled tail and an arched neck. The forehead is wrinkled, even more so when it is young or extremely excited. The eyes are almond-shaped. The average height at the withers is 40 cm for bitches and 43 cm for dogs; the corresponding average body weights are 9.5 kg and 11 kg respectively.

The FCI standard states that when moving, their legs should be "carried straight forward with a swift, long, tireless, swinging stride". According to the Royal Kennel Club, the following colours are acceptable: red and white; black, white, and tan with tan melon pips and mask; black, white, and tan; and brindle and white (red background with clearly defined black stripes).

According to the book The Intelligence of Dogs, they are the second least trainable dog, when required to do human commands (behind only the Afghan Hound).

== Health ==
There is only one completed health survey of dog breeds, including the Basenji, that was conducted by the UK Kennel Club in 2004. The survey indicated the prevalence of diseases in Basenjis with dermatitis (9% of responses), incontinence and bladder infection (5%), hypothyroidism (4%), pyometra and infertility (4%).

=== Longevity ===
Basenjis in the 2004 UK Kennel Club survey had a median lifespan of 13.6 years (sample size of 46 deceased dogs), which is 1–2 years longer than the median lifespan of other breeds of similar size. The oldest dog in the survey was 17.5 years. The most common causes of death were old age (30%), urologic (incontinence, Fanconi syndrome, chronic kidney failure 13%), behaviour ("unspecified" and aggression 9%), and cancer (9%).

=== Fanconi syndrome ===
Fanconi syndrome, an inheritable disorder in which the renal (kidney) tubes fail to reabsorb electrolytes and nutrients, is unusually common in Basenjis.

=== Other Basenji health issues ===
Basenjis sometimes carry a simple recessive gene that, when homozygous for the defect, causes genetic haemolytic anaemia. Most 21st-century Basenjis are descended from ancestors that have tested clean. When lineage from a fully tested line (set of ancestors) cannot be completely verified, the dog should be tested before breeding. As this is a non-invasive DNA test, a Basenji can be tested for HA at any time.

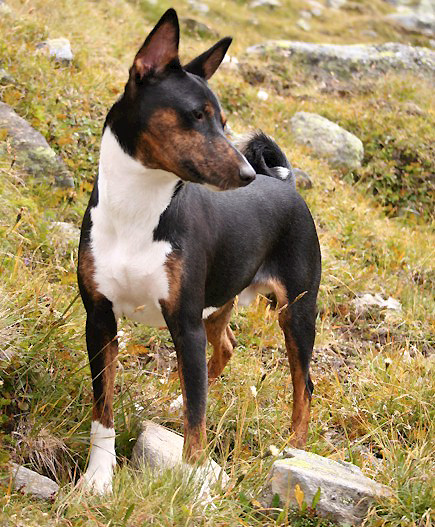
Tricolour

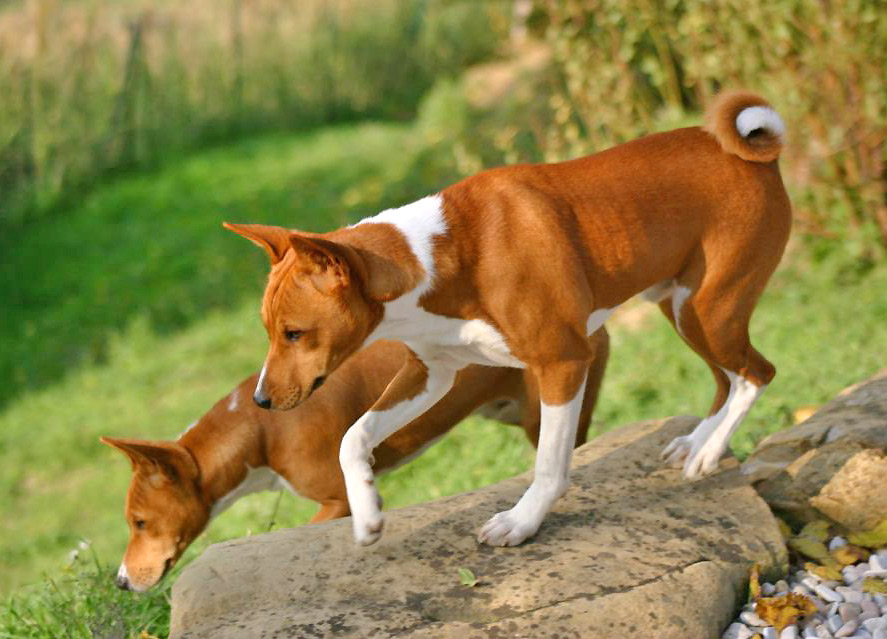

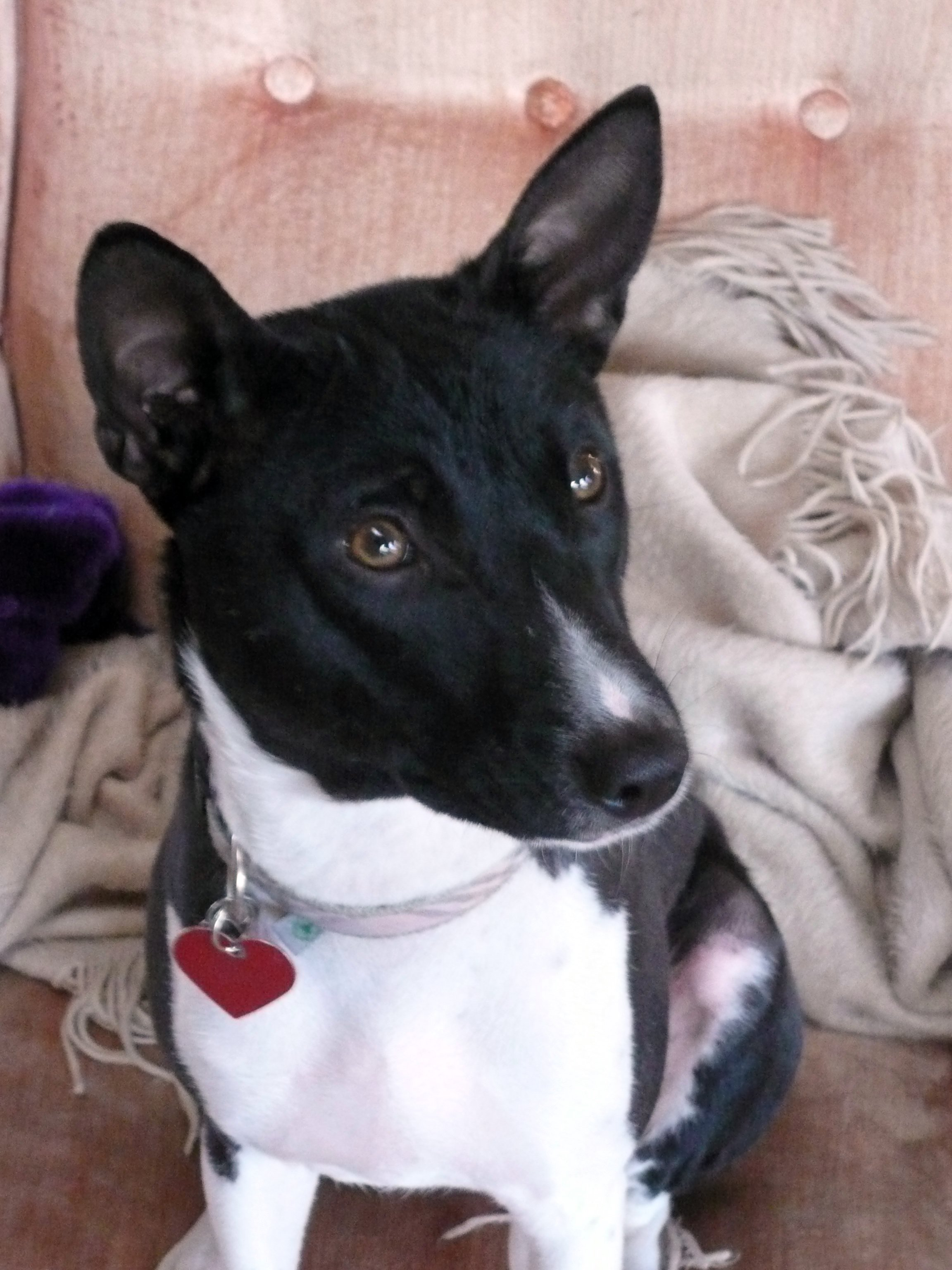

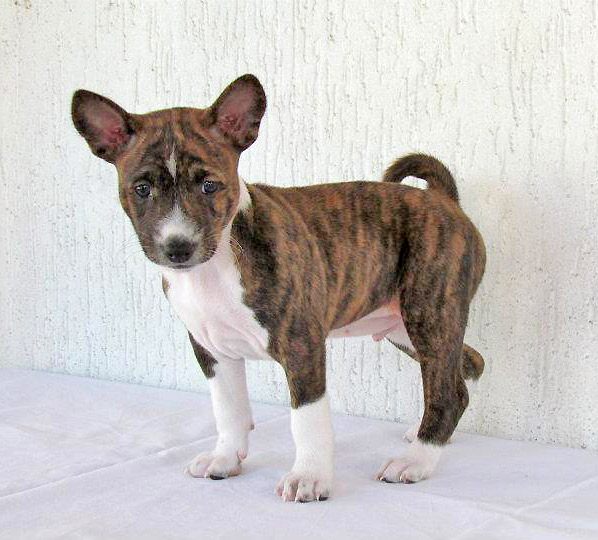
A brindle puppy

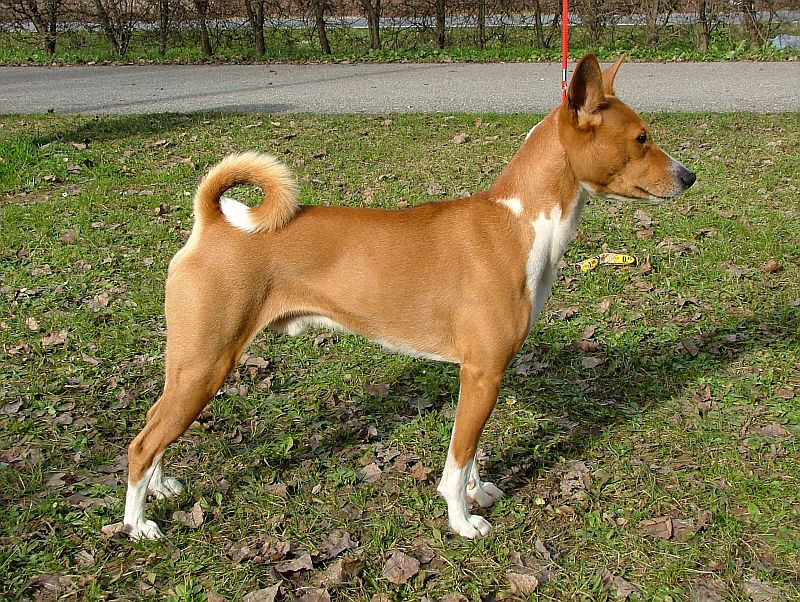
A red dog

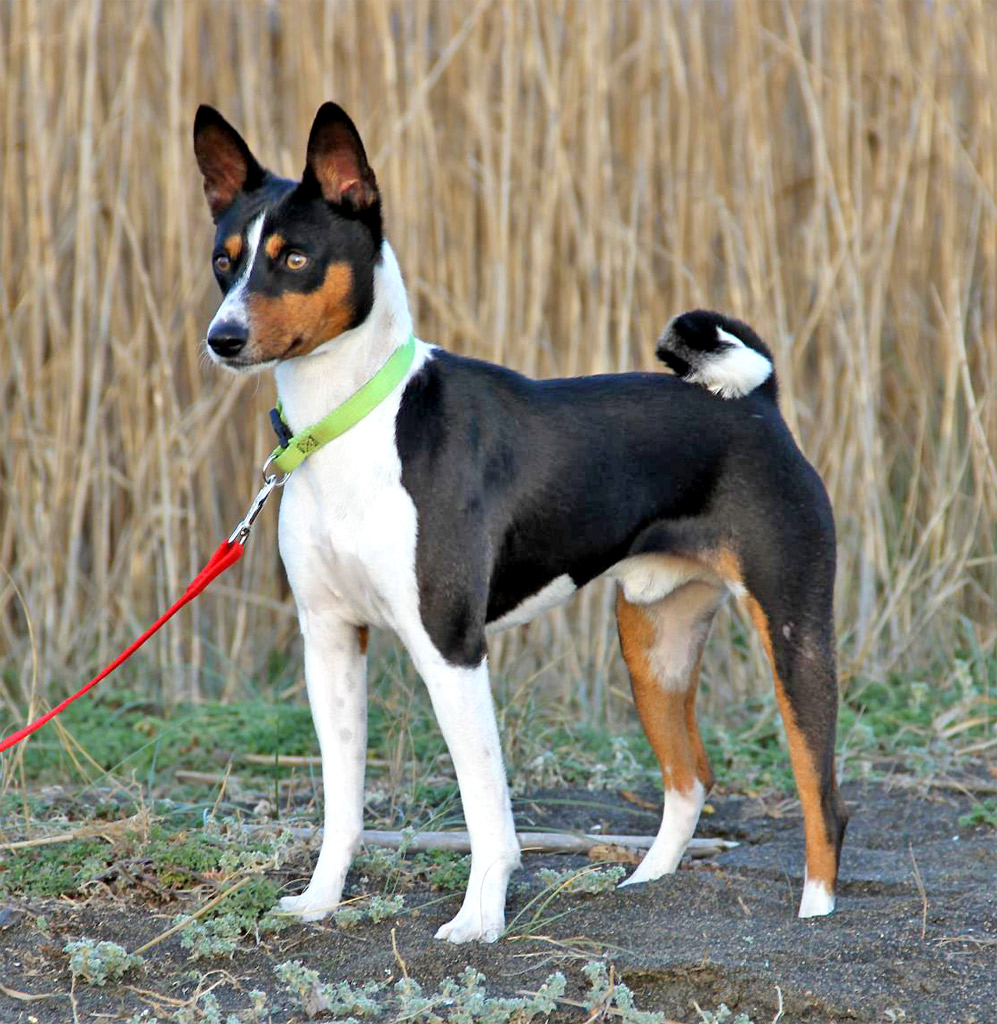
Tricolour with white markings
