= List of monarchs of Kush =

Rulers of ancient kingdom in Nubia

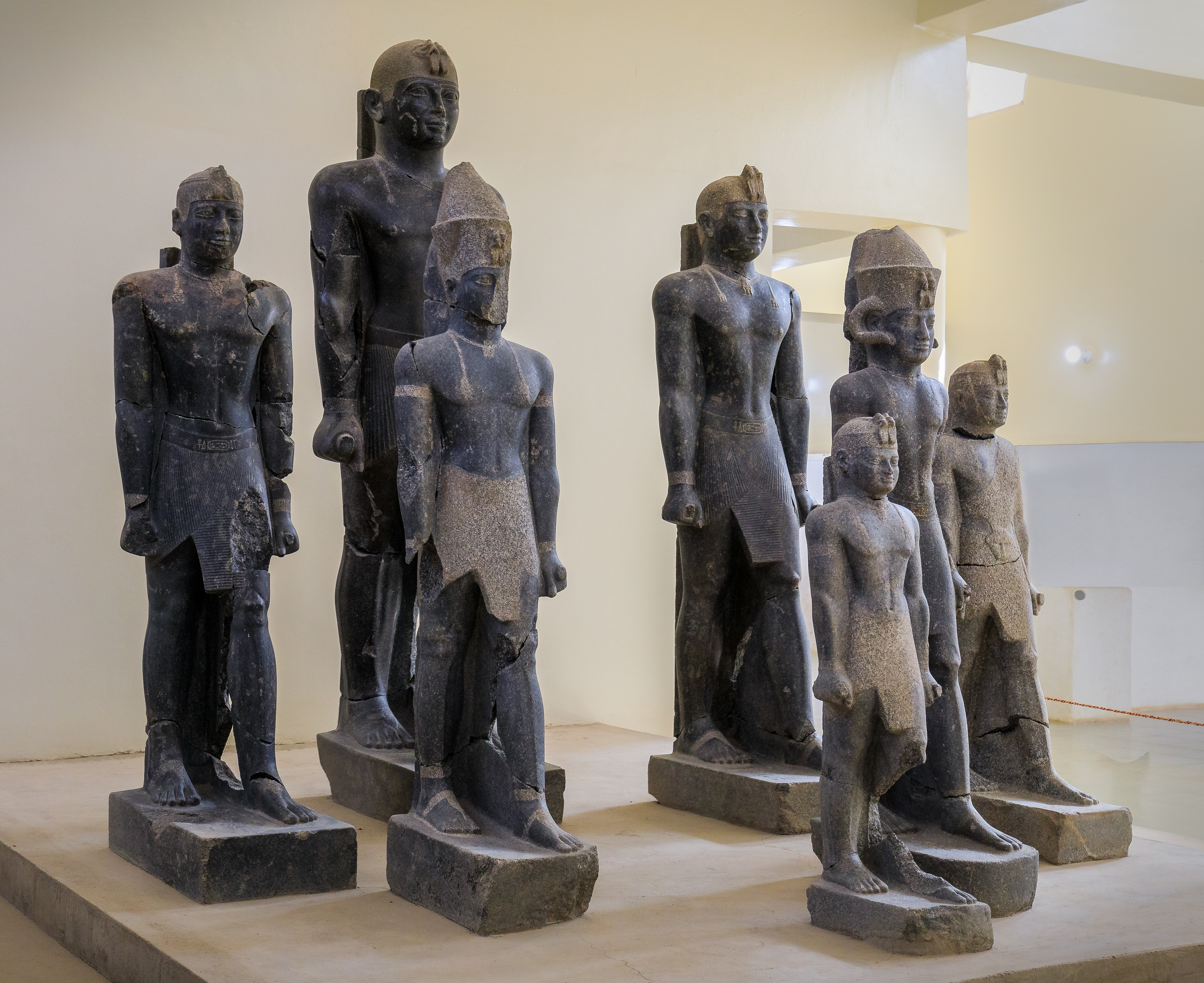
Statues of several Kushite rulers from the 7th century BCE, exhibited in the Kerma Museum. From left to right: Tantamani, Taharqa, Senkamanisken, Tantamani (again), Aspelta, Anlamani, and Senkamanisken (again).

The monarchs of Kush were the rulers of the ancient Kingdom of Kush (8th century BCE – 4th century CE), a major civilization in ancient Nubia (roughly corresponding to modern-day Sudan). Kushite power was centralised and unified over the course of the centuries following the collapse of the New Kingdom of Egypt c. 1069 BCE, leading to the eventual establishment of the Kingdom of Kush under Alara c. 780 BCE.

Kush reached the apex of its power c. 739–656 BCE, when the Kushite kings also ruled as the Twenty-fifth Dynasty of Egypt. The kingdom remained a powerful state in its heartland after Kushite rule in Egypt was terminated and it survived for another millennium until its collapse c. 350 CE. Egyptian culture heavily influenced Kush in terms of its royal and monumental iconography, though indigenous elements were also used and became increasingly prominent in the Meroitic period (c. 270 BCE – 350 CE).

There are no preserved Kushite lists of rulers and the regnal sequence is instead largely reconstructed based on evidence such as royal inscriptions and burials. Surviving sources are at several points scant, meaning that parts of the chronology and sequence are approximate and tentative. The list of rulers might also be incomplete given that future discoveries of additional royal names and burials are possible.

== Introduction ==
=== Royal succession in Kush ===
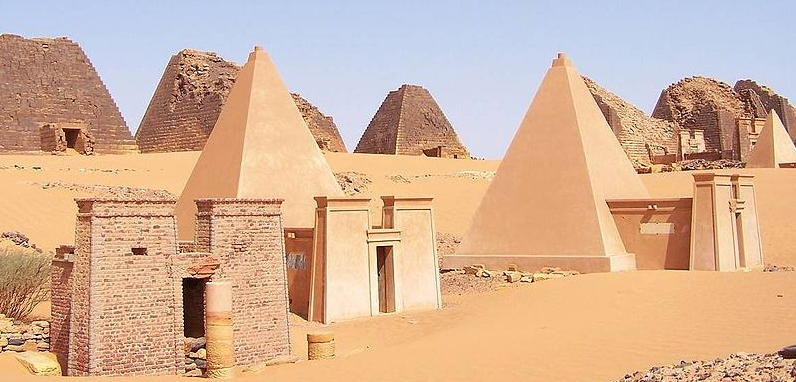
Kushite royal pyramids in Meroë

The system of royal succession in the Kingdom of Kush is not well understood. There are no known administrative documents or histories written by the Kushites themselves; because very little of the royal genealogy can be reliably reconstructed, it is impossible to determine how the system functioned in theory and when or if it was ever broken. Royal women were prominent in Kushite society, especially in the Meroitic period (c. 270 BCE–350 CE). As a consequence it has long been disputed whether the Kushite succession was mainly patrilineal (inherited through male lines) or matrilineal (inherited through female lines). Further uncertainties would exist within either system; a patrilineal system can for instance be based around successions that are mainly father→son or mainly brother→brother.

No ruling Kushite queens are known from before the Meroitic period, suggesting that they may have been excluded from holding office during earlier periods. Despite this, there are numerous royal inscriptions from pre-Meroitic kings, for instance Aspelta, that place emphasis only on their female ancestors. This is on its own generally not considered sufficient evidence for purely matrilineal succession and patrilineal relations are often assumed between rulers even when unsupported by evidence. As examples, kings Alara and Kashta are often assumed to have been brothers and Piye is often assumed to have been Kashta's son, though neither relation is supported by any direct evidence. Based on succession in Egypt during the New Kingdom (c. 1550–1069 BCE) and Third Intermediate (c. 1069–664 BCE) periods, it is conceivable that female lines of descent were just as important as male ones for establishing legitimacy. According to the archaeologist Robert Morkot, the heir who succeeded in claiming the throne might simply have been the strongest eligible royal descendant, instead of there being a clear succession system. Some successions, such as Taharqa to Tantamani to Atlanersa (seventh century BCE), are difficult to explain under either pure patrilineality or pure matrilineality.

It was in older scholarship on Kush assumed that all monarchs were direct descendants of earlier monarchs. In the case of the especially limited material available for large parts of the Meroitic period, this in cases led to the assumption that any figure mentioned as the father of a ruling monarch must also have been a king, even if they are never attested in that role or mentioned elsewhere. Examples of such fathers of monarchs include Pisakar, Adeqetali, Teritnide, Arotnide, and Teritedakhetey, who sometimes still figure in modern reconstructed regnal lists (though most reconstructions omit them). In addition to not being directly attested as monarchs themselves, the names of these individuals do not fit with the known type of Kushite royal names, and counting them as kings ignores the prospect of succession through indirect and/or female lines, both of which are believed to have transpired. There were Kushite rulers in the Meroitic period who can be confidently established to have had non-ruling fathers.

=== List format and content ===
Locations of Napata and Meroë in Sudan

There is no universally used periodisation of Kushite history. This list uses the chronological scheme proposed by Emberling (2023), which divides Kushite history into the following four periods: Early Napatan (coalescence of Kushite political authority in Napata), Middle Napatan (from Alara to the end of Kushite dominion over Egypt), Late Napatan (after the loss of Egypt while royal burials continued at Napata), and Meroitic (royal burials at Meroë) periods.

Precise regnal dates are not known for any Kushite monarchs after the end of Kushite dominion over Egypt. This list thus only includes approximate timeframes, cited to modern sources. Some older sources provide precise dates for each ruler. These dates usually derive from a speculative 1923 chronology by George Andrew Reisner, who based the dates on a handful of synchronisms with Egyptian history, used a wholly hypothetical average reign length of 15 years, and assigned longer reigns and shorter reigns based on the size and richness of burials.

This list includes the tomb of each monarch (in the 'burial' column) and names them using abbreviations. The abbreviations are shorthands for the different Kushite burial pyramid complexes, with the numbers indicating a particular pyramid or temple. "Kur." stands for Kurru (i.e. El-Kurru) ,"Nu." stands for Nuri, "Bar." stands for Jebel Barkal, and "Beg." stands for Begrawiyah (Meroë). "Beg. N" and "Beg. S" refer to the northern and southern cemeteries of Meroë, respectively. El-Kurru, Nuri, and Jebel Barkal are all located by the ancient city of Napata; Meroë was a different city further south.

== List of monarchs ==
=== Early Napatan period (1069–780 BCE) ===
The Early Napatan period began with Kush becoming autonomous or independent in the wake of the collapse of the New Kingdom of Egypt, c. 1069 BCE. The material from Kush during this time is extremely scant. There may have been several local Kushite political units, not properly unified into a single kingdom until the beginning of the later Middle Napatan period. During the Early Napatan period, political authority in the region slowly coalesced around Napata. The original royal cemetery of Napata (El-Kurru) contains several (unnamed) burials that are earlier in age than the later Middle Napatan period, perhaps the burials of local chieftains. These have sometimes been interpreted as the burials of around five generations of kings earlier than Alara, the earliest Kushite king known by name. Alara is however generally considered the founder of Kush by historians since he was referenced in the writings of later monarchs as a dynastic founder, in contexts suggesting that he also established the kingdom.

=== Middle Napatan period (780–656 BCE) ===
– Also pharaoh of Egypt (25th dynasty)

The Middle Napatan period began with the rule of the earliest known named Kushite monarch, Alara, and encompassed the later period of Kushite rule over Egypt (as Ancient Egypt's 25th dynasty). This list includes the conventional speculative patrilineal relationships between some of the rulers; these are not accepted by all scholars and it is possible that as many as three intermarrying families were involved in the early stages of the kingdom.

Portrait	Name	Reign	Succession and notes	Burial
	Alara	c. 780–760 BCE (traditional dates)	The earliest known Kushite ruler; in later times considered a dynastic founder. There is no contemporary evidence from Alara's reign but he is named in the funerary inscription of his daughter Tabiry (wife of Piye) and was also named as an ancestor by his successors. Piye's direct predecessor was Kashta, so Alara was likely Kashta's direct predecessor.	Kur. 9 (Note: There are no inscriptions that identify Alara's tomb. Burial in Kur. 9 is assumed because of its topographical position. Kur. 9 is also the earliest Kushite tomb with a funerary offering table and a tomb stela, aligning with Alara's reign marking the beginning of further cultural "Egyptianization" of the Kushite dynasty.) (assumed)
	Kashta	c. 760–747 BCE	Brother of Alara (?). Established Kushite control over Upper Egypt c. 760 BCE and proclaimed himself as pharaoh, challenging the claims of Egyptian rulers further north. Secured his daughter Amenirdis I's appointment as God's Wife of Amun.	Kur. 8 (Note: The assumption that Kashta is buried in Kur. 8 derives from the tomb being roughly contemporary with his reign and it corresponding further to Egyptian tradition than earlier royal tombs.) (assumed)
	Piye	c. 747–716 BCE	Son of Kashta (?) and son-in-law of Alara. Conquered Egypt in an extensive 739 BCE military campaign, making Kashta's pharaonic claim a political reality and establishing the 'Kushite Empire' (Twenty-fifth Dynasty of Egypt).	Kur. 17
	Shebitku	c. 716–702 BCE	Possibly son of Piye and Queen Peksater or maybe a brother of Piye. Moved the capital from Napata to Memphis. Entered into trade and diplomacy with the Assyrian king Sargon II.	Kur. 18
	Shabaka	c. 702–690 BCE	Son of Shebitku (?). Established full control over the Nile Delta; defeated the delta-based rival Pharaoh Bakenranef. Intervened in the Assyrian king Sennacherib's campaign in the Levant in 701 BCE, on the side of the Kingdom of Judah.	Kur. 15
	Taharqa	690–664 BCE	Son of Piye and Queen Abar. Had a largely peaceful and prosperous reign, overseeing several building projects in Egypt and Kush. Lost Egypt to the Assyrian Empire in 671 BCE and transferred the capital back to Napata. Recaptured Egypt but defeated again in 667 BCE. Founded a new royal cemetery in Nuri, used by later kings for c. 300 years.	Nu. 1
	Tantamani	664–after 656 BCE	Son of Shabaka and Queen Qalhata. Recaptured Egypt from the Assyrians in 664 BCE, though was defeated and driven away the next year. Remained recognised in Upper Egypt until 656 BCE, whereafter the Kushites completely lost control over Egypt. Last ruler to be buried at the ancestral Kushite royal cemetery in El-Kurru.	Kur. 16

=== Late Napatan period (656–270 BCE) ===
The Late Napatan period encompasses Kushite history after the loss of Egypt, for as long as Napata remained the site used for royal burials.

Portrait	Name	Reign	Succession and notes	Burial
Phase I: The first four kings of the Late Napatan period are well-attested and maintained much of the earlier Kushite royal practices.
	Atlanersa	Second half of the 7th century BCE	Son of Taharqa (?) and Queen (...)salka (?). Kush may have faced an invasion led by Pharaoh Psamtik I under either Atlanersa or his successor, though the evidence is lacking. Began building Temple B700 in Jebel Barkal.	Nu. 20
	Senkamanisken	Second half of the 7th century BCE	Son of Atlanersa (?) and Queen Maletaral. Finished building Temple B700.	Nu. 3
	Anlamani	Late 7th century BCE	Son of Senkamanisken (?) and Queen Nasalsa. Earliest ruler documented to have undertaken the traditional Kushite coronation journey, being crowned in Meroë, Napata, and Kawa.	Nu. 6
	Aspelta	Early 6th century BCE	Son of Senkamanisken (?) and Queen Nasalsa. Younger brother of Anlamani. Likely king at the time of Pharaoh Psamtik II's 593 BCE war against Kush. The amount and quality of his monuments indicates a prosperous reign. Aspelta's name being erased in some places also suggests that he faced some unknown internal political controversy.	Nu. 8
Phase II: Little information is recorded from Kush during the reigns of the kings immediately following Aspelta. The chronology is approximate and not much is known other than names and places of burial. Around this time the capital was also moved to Meroë while Napata remained the site of burials.
	Aramatle-qo	Second quarter of the 6th century BCE	Son of Aspelta (?) and Queen Kheb (?), a daughter of Anlamani. Known from his tomb, a statue, and inscriptions in Meroë.	Nu. 9
	Malonaqen	First half of the 6th century BCE	Son of Armatleqo (?) and Queen Amanitakaye (?). Known from his tomb, building activity, and various inscriptions.	Nu. 5
	Analmaye	Middle of the 6th century BCE (Note: Tentative chronological position determined based on the topographical position of tombs.)	Unknown descent. Known from his tomb.	Nu. 18
	Amaninatakilebte	Second half of the 6th century BCE	Unknown descent. Known from his tomb, building activity, and various inscriptions.	Nu. 10
	Piankhariten (Note: Piankhariten is omitted in several recent lists of Kushite rulers.)	Second half of the 6th century BCE (?) (Note: Nu. 25 dates to around the time of Amaninatakilebte. Piankhariten is placed after Amaninatakilebte by Rose (1985).)	Unknown descent. Known from cartouches on objects in Nu. 25 (burial of a queen consort).	Unidentified
	Karkamani	Second half of the 6th century BCE	Unknown descent. Known from his tomb and inscriptions in Meroë.	Nu. 7
	Amaniastabarqa	Late 6th century BCE	Unknown descent. Known from his tomb.	Nu. 2
	Siaspiqa	Early 5th century BCE	Unknown descent. Known from his tomb and inscriptions in Meroë.	Nu. 4
	Nasakhma	First half of the 5th century BCE	Unknown descent. Known from his tomb.	Nu. 19
	Malewiebamani	Middle 5th century BCE	Son of Nasakhma (?) and Queen Saka'aye (?). Known from his tomb.	Nu. 11
	Talakhamani	Second half of the 5th century BCE	Younger brother of Malewiebamani (?). (Note: The assumption that Talakhamani (whose family is not recorded) was Malewiebamani's brother derives from Amanineteyerike recording himself as the son of Malewiebamani but the successor of Talakhamani.) Known from his tomb and inscriptions by his successor.	Nu. 16
Phase III: Kushite rulers beginning with Amanineteyerike revive some earlier practices. Their royal titularies suggest a period of greater political ambition.
	Amanineteyerike	Second half of the 5th century BCE	Son of Malewiebamani. Known from his tomb and several inscriptions. Amanineteyerike's royal titles are strongly associated with rule in Egypt, suggesting (unrealised) hopes of restoring Kushite rule there.	Nu. 12
	Baskakeren	Late 5th century BCE	Unknown descent. (Note: Baskakeren is in older sources sometimes suggested to have been a son of Malewiebamani. Fontes Historiae Nubiorum considers this suggestion to be "without any foundation".) Known from his tomb, the small size of which could indicate a short and insignificant reign.	Nu. 17
	Harsiotef	Early 4th century BCE (c. 400–360 BCE)	Son of one of his predecessors (Note: Harsiotef's father is in older sources sometimes suggested to have been Amanineteyerike, though no evidence exists.) and Queen Atasamale. Had a documented reign of at least 35 years, the longest recorded reign of any Kushite ruler. The great political and geographical range of Harsiotef's recorded wars indicate a time of empire-building and expansionism.	Nu. 13
	Piankalara (?)	Middle 4th century BCE (?) (Note: Kur. 1 is conventionally dated between Harsiotef and Akhraten, though this is hypothetical.)	An unknown ruler from this time is likely associated with the pyramid Kur. 1. This pyramid was never used for burial but the change in location could indicate political unrest and perhaps a royal claimant from a rival lineage.	Kur. 1 (unused)
	Akhraten	Second half of the 4th century BCE (fl. c. 340 BCE)	Son of Harsiotef (?). (Note: Akhraten is in older sources sometimes suggested to have been a son of Harsiotef. Fontes Historiae Nubiorum considers this suggestion to "remain unsubstantiated by any evidence" but also states that his throne name indicates descent from Harsiotef.) Known from his tomb and from a granite statue. The statue and the large size of his pyramid indicates that his reign was prosperous and important.	Nu. 14
	Amanibakhi	Second half of the 4th century BCE (?) (Note: Amanibakhi is conventionally placed between Akhraten and Nastasen, though this is completely hypothetical.)	Unknown descent. Known from a stela and an offering table found in Nuri.	Unidentified
	Nastasen	Last third of the 4th century BCE (fl. c. 325 BCE)	Son of Harsiotef (?) (Note: The titles of Nastasen's mother suggest that Nastasen was the son of a previous king, though his father's identity is not certain. His own stela suggests dynastic ties to Harsiotef and he has sometimes been assumed to be this ruler's son, though the chronological distance could be too great.) and Queen Pelkha. Known from his tomb, a stela, and several inscriptions. Continued the empire-building and militant policies of Harsiotef.	Nu. 15
Phase IV: The end of Nastasen's reign concludes the period of revival. This time is one of the least-known in Kushite history; rulers are mostly attested only in inscription fragments and the chronology is hypothetical and problematic.
	Aktisanes	Late 4th century BCE (Note: Aktisanes copied the Horus name of Philip Arrhidaeus in Egypt. Along with being mentioned by Hecataeus of Abdera, this suggests a reign in the late 4th century BCE, at the latest around the time of Ptolemy I Soter.)	Unknown descent. Known from a handful of inscriptions. Mentioned in the works of the Greek historian Hecataeus of Abdera.	Bar. 14 (Note: Aktisanes was likely buried at Jebel Barkal since the burials at Nuri ceased after Nastasen. He was probably buried in one of the unidentified pyramids in the southern part of the cemetery, of which Bar. 14 is a hypothetical suggestion.) (hypothetical)
	Aryamani	Late 4th/early 3rd century BCE	Unknown descent. Known from a stela found in Kawa.	Bar. 11 (Note: Aryamani is known from the stela Kawa XIV. Egyptologist M. F. Laming Macadam also assigned Kawa XV to Aryamani based on "stylistic and archaeological considerations". Kawa XV speaks of a king who ruled at least 24 years. Based on such a long reign, he has speculatively been attributed Bar. 11, the largest pyramid of Jebel Barkal in the time after Nastasen.) (hypothetical)
	Kash(...)amani	Late 4th/early 3rd century BCE	Unknown descent. Known from a fragmentary cartouche impressed on a gold leaf. Name type suggests reign sometime between Aktisanes and Sabrakamani.	Unidentified
	Arikepiankhiqo	Late 4th/early 3rd century BCE	Unknown descent. Known only from an inscription by his successor.	Unidentified
	Sabrakamani	First half of the 3rd century BCE	Unknown descent. Known only from an inscription in Kawa which also identifies Arikepiankhiqo as his direct predecessor.	Unidentified

=== Meroitic period (270 BCE–350 CE) ===
In third century BCE, the royal burial ground was moved from Napata to Meroë for the burial of Arakamani. This marked the final step in a more gradual transfer of political authority and wealth to Meroë and is regarded as the beginning of the Meroitic period. The change in capital should not be misinterpreted as indicating a break in historical or cultural continuity; Napata continued to function as an important religious centre and evidence suggests that Meroë had been important from very early on. It is possible that Meroë served as the residence of the Kushite kings from as early as the fifth century BCE.

From the 2nd century BCE onwards, Kush is noteworthy for a large number of queens regnant (queens ruling in their own right). Queens regnant retained their earlier style (often kandake) when becoming rulers, though they also adopted the kingly title of qore to indicate their new authority. Due to the high number of ruling queens in the Meroitic period, absent in earlier times, the gender of each monarch is here indicated by a gender symbol (♀ or ♂). In cases where the gender is unknown, no symbol is included.

The royal succession, sequence, and chronology of Kushite rulers is especially uncertain in the Meroitic period. By necessity this list shows only one interpretation, though noteworthy alternate ideas are featured in footnotes. Given that the throne appears to have been able to pass through male, female, and indirect lines, this list simply records the parents (if known) of each monarch in the 'filiation' column, without speculation on their overall relations. The use of the ♔ symbol in this column indicates that the parent of a monarch was also a monarch.

Portrait	Name (gender)	Reign	Filiation	Notes	Burial
	Arakamani (♂) (Ergamenes I)	c. 270–middle 3rd century BCE	Parents unknown	Known in Kush only from his tomb. Identified with 'Ergamenes', who appears in the work of the Greek historian Agatharchides. Contemporary of Ptolemy II in Egypt.	Beg. S 6
	Amanislo (♂)	Middle 3rd century BCE	Arakamani (father ♔) (?) (Note: Amanislo has been speculated to have been the son of Queen Sar(...)tiñ, buried in Beg. S 4, who in turn has been speculated to have been wife to Arakamani.); Sar(...)tiñ (mother) (?)	Known from his tomb and from cartouches inscribed on lion statues. Restored Palace B1200 in Napata.	Beg. S 5
	Amantekha (♂)	Second half of the 3rd century BCE	Parents unknown	Known from his tomb. Amantekha's tomb is relatively small though also important as the earliest burial in Meroë's northern cemetery.	Beg. N 4
	Unknown king (Note: This king's throne name was Šsp-ˋnḫ-n-ʾImn Stp.n-Rˋ (Shesepankhenamen Setepenre); his personal name is not preserved.) (♂)	Second half of the 3rd century BCE	Parents unknown	Known from fragmentry inscriptions on a stray block in Meroë's northern cemetery. Contemporary of Ptolemy III in Egypt.	Unidentified
	Arnekhamani (♂)	Second half of the 3rd century BCE (c. 240–215 BCE)	Parents unknown	Known from monumental buildings, some of the most impressive in Kushite history. Contemporary of Ptolemy III and Ptolemy IV in Egypt.	Beg. N 53 (Note: Virtually all scholars attribute Beg. N 53 to this king, though this has not been securely established.) (assumed)
	Arqamani (♂) (Ergamenes II)	Late 3rd–early 2nd century BCE	Arnekhamani (father ♔) (?); Mother unknown	Known from his tomb and inscriptions at Philae, Dakka, and Kalabsha. Reconquered Triakontaschoinos from Egypt. Contemporary of Ptolemy IV and Ptolemy V in Egypt.	Beg. N 7
	Adikhalamani (Note: The pyramid Beg. N 8 is the burial site of "(...)mr(...)t" and Beg. N 9 is the burial site of "Tabirqo". Kuckertz (2021) identifies (...)mr(...)t as Adikhalamani and Tabirqo as a distinct succeeding king. Török (2015) instead identifies Tabirqo as a funerary name of Adikhalamani and (...)mr(...)t as a distinct succeeding king.) (♂)	First half of the 2nd century BCE	Parents unknown	Known from inscriptions at Philae. Contemporary of Ptolemy V in Egypt.	Beg. N 8 (assumed)
	Tabirqo (♂)	First half of the 2nd century BCE	Parents unknown	Known from his tomb.	Beg. N 9
	Unknown king (♂)	2nd century BCE	Parents unknown	Known from his planned tomb, Beg. N 10. This pyramid does not preserve his name and was never used for burial.	Beg. N 10 (unused)
	Nahirqo (♀)	Middle 2nd century BCE	Parents unknown	Known from an inscription and attributed objects. Earliest known female ruler. Former wife of Adikhalamani. (Note: Attested as the wife of (...)mr(...)t, identified as Adikhalamani by Kuckertz (2021).)	Beg. N 11 (Note: Beg. N 11 was in older sources sometimes attributed to Sanakadakhete. Sanakadakhete's revised chronological position means that Beg. N 11 is instead "attributed with good reasons" to Nahirqo.) (assumed)
	Tanyidamani (♂)	Second half of the 2nd century BCE	Adikhalamani (father ♔) (?) (Note: Tanyidamani was the son of the queen regnant buried in Beg. N 11.); Nahirqo (mother ♔) (?)	Known from numerous inscriptions in Jebel Barkal and Meroë. The earliest known monumental inscriptions written in Meroitic are from Tanyidamani's reign.	Beg. N 12 (Note: Beg. N 12 is assumed to be Tanyidamani's burial since it is from the generation immediately after Beg. N 11.) (assumed)
	Pakhedateqo (♂)	End of the 2nd–first half of the 1st century BCE	Parents unknown	Known only from an inscription on a rock, dated using palaeography to around Tanyidamani's time.	Unidentified
	Unknown queen (Note: The queen buried in Bar. 8 has been suggested to have been the wife of the earlier ruler Arnekhamani.) (♀)	End of the 2nd–first half of the 1st century BCE	Parents unknown	Known from a tomb dated to this time, which does not preserve a name.	Bar. 8
	Naqyrinsan (♂)	First half of the 1st century BCE	Parents unknown	Known from an inscription on an offering table found in pyramid Beg. N 13, presumably his tomb.	Beg. N 13 (assumed)
	Teriteqas (Note: Per Yellin (2015) and Kuckertz (2021), the Horus name [Horus] k_{3}-nht, known from a tomb at Meroë and sometimes considered a distinct king in earlier research, is to be identified with Teriteqas.) (♂)	Late 1st century BCE	Parents unknown	Known from Meroitic inscriptions at Dakka. The direct predecessor of Amanirenas. Contemporary of Cleopatra VII in Egypt and Augustus in Rome.	Beg. N 20 (Note: The tomb of [Horus] k_{3}-nht. Attributed another tomb if this ruler's identification with Teriteqas is not accepted, such as Bar. 2 (Török 2015).) (assumed)
	Amanirenas (♀)	End of the 1st century BCE–beginning of the 1st century CE	Parents unknown	Known from four inscriptions. Attested as kandake under Teriteqas (perhaps her husband) and then as qore. Contemporary of Augustus in Rome; successfully defended Kush against Roman expansion.	Bar. 4 (Note: Bar. 4 does not preserve the name of the ruler buried but is the conventionally attributed pyramid of Amanirenas. This pyramid depicts a queen regnant with the Double Crown of Egypt and dates to the time of the Julio-Claudian dynasty in Rome.) (assumed)
	Amanishakheto (♀)	Early 1st century CE	Father unknown Ar(...)tḫwit (mother)	Very well documented. Likely the direct successor of Amanirenas, though the relation between them is unclear. Had a prosperous reign and oversaw considerable building projects and administrative reorganisation.	Beg. N 6
	Shanakdakhete (♀)	First half of the 1st century CE (Note: Shanakdakhete's inscriptions were previously interpreted as the first instance of the Meroitic script, which would place her in the second century BCE. This date also led to identifications with the pyramid Beg. N 11 (now attributed to Nahirqo). Newer palaeographic studies place Shanadakhete at "around the turn of the centuries BCE – CE, or in the first half of the first century CE". Shanadakhete ruled before or after Amanishakheto; Kuckertz (2021) places her as Amanishakheto's successor.)	Parents unknown	Known from inscriptions on a temple she built in Naqa. Previously misplaced in the chronology three centuries earlier due to a misinterpretation of her inscriptions.	Beg. N 21 (Note: Beg. N 21 is a large tomb, speculatively attributed to Shanadakhete by Yellin (2014) and Kuckertz (2021). This tomb has in the past been suggested as belonging to other rulers, such as Teriteqas or Amanirenas.) (hypothetical)
	Unknown king (♂)	First half of the first century CE	Parents unknown	Known from a tomb dated to this time, which does not preserve a name.	Bar. 2
	Nawidemak (♀)	First half of the first century CE (?) (Note: Nawidemak and Amanikhabale are variously dated to before Teriteqas, after Amanishakheto, or somewhere between the two. Objects from the late reign of Roman emperor Augustus or even later, found in Nawidemak's tomb, support them reigning after Amanishakheto.)	Parents unknown	Known from a statuette and from her tomb, which depicts and titles her as a queen regnant.	Bar. 6
	Amanikhabale (♂)	First half of the first century CE (?)	Father unknown Nawidemak (mother ♔) (?) (Note: Amanikhabale's name is known from a fragment of a table found in pyramid Beg. N 3, which can be fitted together with fragments in Beg. N 2 and Beg. N 4, and designates his mother as Nawidemak. Beg. N 2 is generally assumed to be Amanikhabale's burial. Amanikhabale being Nawidemak's son is also supported by the close palaeographic relation between the inscriptions in Bar. 6 and Beg. N 2.)	Known from inscriptions from Kawa, Basa, and Naqa, as well as a broken stela from Meroë. The monuments and their distribution indicate a prosperous reign.	Beg. N 2 (assumed)
	Natakamani (Note: "Aqrakamani", a ruler mentioned in graffiti at the Temple of Dakka and traditionally dated to the late 1st century BCE, has been shown to have been the same person as Natakamani.) (♂)	Middle 1st century CE	Father unknown Amanitore (mother ♔) (Note: Natakamani and Amanitore were sometimes previously suggested to have been husband and wife. A graffito found at the Temple of Dakka strongly suggests that Amanitore was Natakamani's mother.)	Very well documented. Amanitore was Natakamani's mother and they ruled together as co-regents. Only Natakamani was titled as qore (Amanitore being kandake), though both were consistently depicted together in monuments with the regalia of kings and neither is ever attested as sole ruler. Their reign appears to have been a very prosperous period. Contemporaries of Nero in Rome (?).	Beg. N 22
	Amanitore (♀)	Middle 1st century CE	Parents unknown	Very well documented. Amanitore was Natakamani's mother and they ruled together as co-regents. Only Natakamani was titled as qore (Amanitore being kandake), though both were consistently depicted together in monuments with the regalia of kings and neither is ever attested as sole ruler. Their reign appears to have been a very prosperous period. Contemporaries of Nero in Rome (?).	Beg. N 1
	Shorkaror (Note: Shorkaror's royal status has on occasion been doubted, though he is depicted with the attire and regalia of a king in the Gebel Qeili rock carving.) (♂)	Second half of the 1st century CE	Parents unknown (Note: As the heir of Natakamani and Amanitore, Shorkaror was previously interpreted as their son (with them believed to be husband and wife). The identification of Amanitore as Natakamani's mother leaves the familial relationships uncertain.)	Known from two inscriptions in Amara and a large rock carving at Gebel Qeili. Also attested as a prince (Note: Shorkaror was preceded as intended heir by Arikankharor and Arkhatani, both of whom likely predeceased Natakamani and Amanitore.) in the time of Natakamani and Amanitore.	Unidentified
	Amanikhareqerem (♂)	End of the 1st century CE (Note: A Meroitic inscription places Amanikhariqerem as reigning around 80/90 CE.)	Parents unknown	Known from inscriptions on monuments. Possibly the direct successor of Shorkaror.	Beg. N 16 (Note: Assignment of a burial to Amanikhareqerem is purely hypothetical. Kuckertz (2021) assigns him Beg. N 16, a pyramid that was later modified into a smaller structure under Amanitaraqide and Aryesbokhe.) (hypothetical)
	Amanitenmemide (♂)	End of the 1st century–first half of the 2nd century CE	Parents unknown	Known from his tomb and from an inscription in Meroë. Likely the direct successor of Amanikhareqerem. A skull believed to be Amanitenmemide's was found in his tomb and indicates that he died aged c. 30.	Beg. N 17
	Amanikhatashan (♀)	Middle 2nd century CE (?) (Note: Finds in Amanikhtashan's tomb establish that she reigned at some point in the 1st or 2nd century CE. The tomb's artwork is stylistically close to artwork in Beg. N 16, which suggests that she reigned chronologically close to the owner of that tomb.)	Parents unknown	Known from her tomb.	Beg. N 18
	Tarekeniwal (♂)	Second half of the 2nd century CE	Parents unknown	Known from an inscription on an offering table and his tomb. (Note: Tomb Beg. N 19 preserves the name Trekeni(.)l-qo, restored as Trekeniwl. His offering table was found in close proximity to the pyramid. The restoration of the name in the tomb was doubted by Chapman-Dunham in 1952, though was considered likely in the Fontes Historiae Nubiorum (1998) and has been accepted since.) Imagery in Tarekeniwal's tomb places "unusually strong emphasis" on him as a triumphant warrior.	Beg. N 19
	Amanikhalika (♀) (Note: Beg. N 32 is the tomb of a queen regnant who ruled at some point between the mid-2nd century CE and the mid-3rd century CE. The tomb was speculatively attributed to Amanikhalika, the mother of Aritenyesbokhe, in the 1950s and has been supported as such by a large number of scholars. If correct, Amanikhalika would have reigned at around the same time as Tarekeniwal and Aritenyesbokhe. Some scholars have doubted the identification, viewing Beg. N 32 as the tomb of an unknown queen who could have reigned at some other time.)	Second half of the 2nd century CE (?)	Parents unknown	wife of Tarekeniwal. (Note: Aritenyesbokhe's offering table states that he is the son of Tarekeniwal and Amanikhalika. Tarekeniwal is presumably identical with the king of the same name buried in pyramid Beg. N 19.) Known from an inscription on her son Aritenyesbokhe's offering table. Tentatively identified as the ruler buried in Beg. N 32.	Beg. N 32 (tentative)
	Aritenyesbokhe (♂)	Second half of the 2nd century CE	Tarekeniwal (father ♔); Amanikhalika (mother ♔)	Known from an inscription on an offering table and inscriptions on loose blocks in Meroë.	Beg. N 34 (Note: Beg. N 34 does not preserve a name but its identification with Aritenyesbokhe has never been disputed. The reliefs in this pyramid are similar in type and style to those of Beg N. 19, which belongs to Aritenyesbokhe's presumed father.) (assumed)
	Amanitaraqide (♂) (Note: Established as male by the royal benediction formula of his offering table.)	End of the 2nd century CE (?)	Pisakar (father); Amankhadoke (mother)	Known from an inscription on an offering table. Might have had royal descent through his mother. Chronological position and burial site debated. (Note: The Fontes Historiae Nubiorum and Edwards (2004) speculatively assign Amanitaraqide the burial site Beg. N 16 (where his offering table was found). Török (2015) and Kuckertz (2021) assign him to Beg. N 36. The Fontes Historiae Nubiorum places him in the late 1st century CE based on objects in Beg. N 16. Edwards (2004) and Török (2015) likewise date Amanitaraqide to the late 1st century CE. Rilly & Voogt (2012) date him to the second half of the 2nd century CE and Kuckertz (2021) dates him to the end of the 2nd century CE.)	Beg. N 36 (tentative)
	Amanikhedolo (♂)	First half of the 3rd century CE (?)	Akedḫetiwl (father); Amanipiteke (mother)	Known from an inscription on an offering table. Might have had royal descent through his mother. Chronological position uncertain and speculatively identified as the ruler buried in Beg. N 43. (Note: Amanikhedolo's offering table was found in a secondary context (built into the roof) in the pyramid Beg. W 109. The identification of Beg. N 43 as the original burial site is purely hypothetical. Török (2015) instead suggested Beg. N 32, though this is considered the burial site of a female ruler. Kuckertz (2021) proposed on account of the table having been found in the non-royal western cemetery that Amanikhedolo was not a monarch at all but an official or prince who adopted a royal formula on his offering table.)	Beg. N 43 (hypothetical)
	Takideamani (♂) (Note: Now destroyed reliefs and a royal benediction formula in Beg. N 29 establish that Takideamani was male.)	First half of the 3rd century CE	Adeqetli (father); Nptdḫeto (mother)	Known from an inscription on an offering table. Names of his parents suggest lack of direct royal descent. Rough chronological position can be established by the objects found in his tomb.	Beg. N 29
	Mashadakhel	First half of the 3rd century CE (?)	A(...)ble (father); Mother unknown	Known from a partial inscription on an offering table. Likely dates to the 2nd or 3rd century CE, (Note: Mashadakhel's contains the element Mash, the name of a deity whose cult spread in Kush in the 2nd and 3rd centuries CE.) though precise chronological position and burial site unknown. (Note: Mashadakhel's offering table was found in a secondary context (in the descent of the structure) in the pyramid Beg. W 113. Beg. N 32 has (without evidence) been attributed to Mashdakhel, which would make this a female ruler since a queen regnant is depicted in that tomb. Most authors assign Beg. N 32 either to an unknown queen or to Amanikhalika. Török (2015) left Mashadakhel's burial unidentified. Kuckertz (2021) proposed on account of the table having been found in the non-royal western cemetery that Mashadakhel was not a monarch at all but an official or prince/princess who adopted a royal formula on their offering table.)	Unidentified
	Teqorideamani (♂)	Second half of the 3rd century CE	Teritni(d)e (father); Arqtñmaks (mother)	Known from his tomb, a graffito at Philae, and three inscriptions in Meroë. The graffito establishes that he became king in 249 CE. Contemporary of Trebonianus Gallus, and perhaps also Valerian and Gallienus, in Rome. His pyramid is the youngest securely attributed Kushite pyramid.	Beg. N 28
	Tamelerdeamani (♂)	Second half of the 3rd century CE (Note: Older sources sometimes wrongly assign Temelerdeamani to the early 2nd century CE due to a confusion over sources concerning Teqorideamani, and may in this case attribute the pyramid Beg. N 34 to him. These conclusions are no longer supported since Tamelerdeamani necessarily reigned after Teqorideamani, who is known to have been in office in the 250s.)	Arotnide (father); Arqtñmaks (mother)	Younger half-brother of Teqorideamani. Known from an inscription on an offering table. Hypothetically identified as the ruler buried in pyramid Beg. N 27.	Beg. N 27 (hypothetical)
	Talakhidamani (♂?) (Note: Believed to have been a male ruler since the name is a later version of the name of the earlier king Talakhamani and because a female regent for Maloqorebar (if this is the correct interpretation) might be expected to use the style kandake.)	End of the 3rd/first half of the 4th century CE (?)	Parents unknown	Once known only from an enigmatic inscription at Philae. (Note: This inscription reads tdḫe Mloqorebr qoresel Lḫidmni. The text was originally interpreted as "king Maloqorebar, child of Lakhideamani", denoting Maloqorebar as a king and Lakhideamani as a queen regnant. The second inscription at Meroë identifies "qore Talakhideamani" and has allowed the reading of the earlier inscription to be corrected to "the child Maloqorebar and the ruler Talakhideamani".) Securely identified as a ruler in 2017 through another inscription in Meroë. Perhaps initially regent for the prince Maloqorebar, who is not attested to have ever ruled in his own right.	Unidentified
	Aryesbokhe (♂)	End of the 3rd/first half of the 4th century CE (?)	Teritebḫtey (father); Wlamni(..)ptide (mother)	Assumed to have had royal descent through his mother. Known from an inscription on an offering table. Chronological position and burial site debated. (Note: Pyramid Beg. N 16 yielded the offering tables of both Amanitaraqide and Aryesbokhe. This pyramid was restored (perhaps rebuilt) at a later date, possibly around the same time as Beg. N 36 was built just southeast of it. Different palaeographical] analyses of the inscriptions have contradictingly suggested that either Amanitaraqide or Aryesbokhe is older in age. Aryesbokhe being a later king than Amanitaraqide is supported by the style of his table, which is more consistent with a later stage of offering tables. Although Aryesbokhe is sometimes placed in the late 1st or early 2nd century CE, close to Amanitaraqide, recent palaeographical analyses support a later date for Aryesbokhe, perhaps in the second half of the 3rd century CE or the first half of the 4th century CE.)	Beg. N 16 (Note: Beg. N 16 was rebuilt with a chapel inside the pyramid and is presumed to have been Aryesbokhe's burial place. If Aryesbokhe's offering table in Beg. N 16 is interpreted as not originally from this pyramid, his site of burial is sometimes alternatively assumed to be Beg. N 36, since that pyramid may date to around the same time as Beg. N 16 was rebuilt. In such a case, Beg. N 16 is at times identified as the burial of Amanitaraqide since his offering table was also found within it.) (tentative)
	Yesebokheamani (♂)	End of the 3rd/first half of the 4th century CE (?)	Parents unknown	Known from inscriptions. One of these is a dedication text at Philae which might place Yesebokheamani after 298 CE, when the Romans withdrew from that region. Contemporary (?) of Diocletian in Rome.	Beg. N 51 (Note: There is no real basis for identification of this king's burial. Beg. N 24 has also been suggested.) (hypothetical)
	(...)k(...) (♂) (Note: Beg. N 38 is destroyed today but earlier sources indicate that it was the burial of a male ruler.)	First half of the 4th century CE	Parents unknown	Known from a partial inscription on a fragmentary offering table. Speculatively identified as the ruler buried in pyramid Beg. N 38. (Note: There is no data either for or against this identification. Beg. N 38 dates to around or after the end of the 3rd century CE, which is the basis for this ruler's chronological position.)	Beg. N 38 (hypothetical)
	(...)p(...)niñ	First half of the 4th century CE	Arḫrli (father); Mother unknown	Known from a partial inscription on a fragmentary offering table. Speculatively identified as the ruler buried in pyramid Beg. N 37. (Note: Beg. N 37 dates to sometime after Beg. N 28. The late type of lettering in the inscription recording (.)p(...)niñ was used as rationale for attributing Beg. N 37 as this ruler's burial, though no other evidence links the two.)	Beg. N 37 (hypothetical)
	Patrapeamani (♀) (Note: Beg. N 26 is the burial of a female ruler, depicting a queen regnant in its reliefs.)	First half of 4th century CE	Delitey (father) (...)tli (mother)	Known from an inscription on an offering table. Tentatively identified as the ruler buried in pyramid Beg. N 26. (Note: The name Patrapeamani (Pt(.)rpeamni) is known only from Meroitic text on an offering table found in Beg. W 309 (secondarily placed there later). The name was first assigned to Beg. N 26 in 1978. This attribution is tentatively accepted in the Fontes Historiae Nubiorum and by Török (2015). The chronological position of Patrapeamani derives from the pyramid itself being from the terminal period of the Meroë cemetery. Some other authors reject the attribution and regard Beg. N 26 as the burial of an unknown queen. Kuckertz (2021) proposes that Patrapeamani was the name of a non-royal official who adopted royal formulae on their offering table.)	Beg. N 26 (tentative)
	Amanipilade (♀) (Note: Beg. N 25 was identified as the burial of a queen regnant due to its reliefs being interpreted as depicting a woman. This may be an "unsafe interpretation of relief traces" though is cautiously maintained by most scholars.)	Middle 4th century CE	Tehye (father); Mkeḫñye (mother)	Known from an inscription on an offering table. Tentatively identified as the ruler buried in pyramid Beg. N 25. (Note: The name Amanipilade (Mnipilde) is known only from Meroitic text on an offering table found at Beg. W 104 (likely secondarily placed there later). The name was first assigned in 1978 to the pyramid Beg. N 25, the late type of the text thought to match the very late date of the pyramid. This attribution is accepted in the Fontes Historiae Nubiorum and by Török (2015). Some other authors reject the attribution and regard Beg. N 25 as the burial of an unknown monarch. Kuckertz (2021) proposes that Amanipilade was the name of a non-royal official who adopted royal formulae on their offering table.)	Beg. N 25 (tentative)

Beg. N 25 is the last known royal burial in Meroë and is assumed to mark the end of the dynasty ruling from that city. Circumstantial and indirect evidence also dates the end of Meroitic political authority to the middle decades of the fourth century CE.

== Successor states of Kush ==
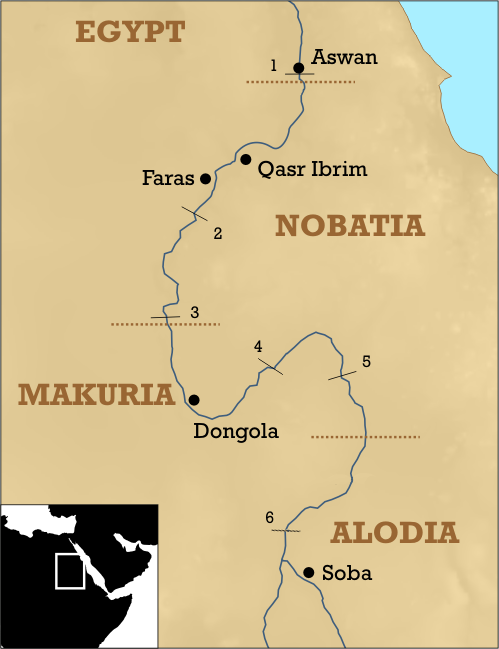
Map of the later Christian kingdoms in Nubia

László Török hypothesised that a unified (Nubian?) 'Post-Meroitic successor state' ruled a territory roughly corresponding to the Kushite kingdom for several decades after the end of the Meroitic period. Such a realm may be indicated by later burials of elites at Ferkeh, Gemai, Qustul and El-Hobagi. Török suggested that these elites were non-royal deputies of a monarch residing in the south. The southern cemetery of Ballana, where seven generations of post-Kushite but pre-Christian rulers are buried, has sometimes been suggested to belong to a successor state of Kush, though the burials share few ideological similarities with those of the Kushite rulers beyond the presence of silver crowns in a similar style. The existence of a unified post-Meroitic state is not universally accepted. Josefine Kuckertz, for instance, instead dates the disintegration of the kingdom to already in the middle fourth century CE, at the same time as the fall of the Meroitic dynasty.

Around 420 CE, the aforementioned elites or deputies began assuming royal insignia of their own, resulting in the disintegration of the supposed successor state (if one existed) into the later kingdoms of Nobatia (north), Makuria (center), and Alodia (south). Out of these three, Nobatia is in particular sometimes considered a small post-imperial remnant of Kush, maintaining some aspects of Kushite culture but also exhibiting Hellenistic and Roman influences. The early stage of Nobatia is conventionally associated with the Ballana cemetery.

== Unattributed royal burials ==
There are many Kushite pyramids in addition to those listed above, built for individuals such as consorts, princes, and high officials. Because of the size and the number of chambers, some pyramids without preserved names have been suggested to have belonged to monarchs. Some such pyramids are included in the list above, with tentative and hypothetical attributions put forth by researchers. Other pyramids sometimes identified as belonging to rulers are listed below. There are no unattributed royal burials from El-Kurru or Nuri. (Note: Other than Kur. 1 (already accounted for in the list), the only unidentified pyramids at El-Kurru are from before Alara and thus considered to perhaps be from local chieftains rather than Kushite kings. There are no known pyramids at Nuri that remain unidentified.)

Whether these pyramids belong to monarchs is often disputed. Pyramids thought to belong to rulers have sometimes been reinterpreted: Beg. S 10 was once attributed to King "Bartare-(Kalkai)" but is now recognised as the tomb of a non-ruling queen consort. These additional tombs should not be interpreted as on their own indicating additional Kushite rulers. In addition to possible misinterpretation, some tombs could match rulers whose burials are 'unidentified' in the list above and some of the tentative and hypothetical attributions listed above could be wrong.

Site	Burial	Dating	Notes
Jebel Barkal	Bar. 18	Late 4th/early 3rd century BCE	A smaller king's pyramid (?) from Phase IV of the Late Napatan period
Jebel Barkal	Bar. 19	Late 4th/early 3rd century BCE	A smaller king's pyramid (?) from Phase IV of the Late Napatan period
Meroë	Beg. N 14	1st century CE	Burial of a king (?). Destroyed by E. A. Wallis Budge.
Meroë	Beg. N 15	Second half of the 2nd century CE	Burial of a ruler (?). Destroyed by E. A. Wallis Budge.
Meroë	Beg. N 24	After the middle 3rd century CE	Pyramid of a ruler (?) post-dating Teqorideamani
Meroë	Beg. N 30	Late 2nd century/early 3rd century CE (?)	Burial of a king (?)
Meroë	Beg. N 35	3rd century CE (?)	Burial of a king (?)
Meroë	Beg. N 40	Late 2nd century/early 3rd century CE (?)	Burial of a king (?)
Meroë	Beg. N 41	Late 3rd century CE (?)	Burial of a king (?)

== See also ==
Viceroy of Kush
