= Tamelerdeamani =

Kushite King of Meroë
- Reign: Second half of the 3rd century AD
- Predecessor: Teqorideamani
- Successor: Talakhidamani (?)
Royal titulary
- Burial: Pyramid Beg. N 27 at Meroë (?)

Tamelerdeamani was a king of Kush who ruled in the second half of the 3rd century AD. He was the younger half-brother of his predecessor, Teqorideamani. His successor is not known, though may based on the overall chronology have been Talakhidamani.

Tamelerdeamani is known only from an inscription on an offering table. Like other monarchs of his time he was presumably buried at Meroë. He has speculatively been attributed either pyramid Beg. N 27 or pyramid Beg. N 34. Beg. N 34 is no longer supported as Tamelerdeamani's tomb; older scholarship sometimes erroneously dated him to the early 2nd century AD over a confusion of sources, the time in which that pyramid was built. Beg. N 27 is now more supported since Tamelerdeamani necessarily reigned after his older half-brother, who is known to have been king in the 250s.
