= Shesepankhenamen Setepenre =

Kushite King of Meroë
- Reign: c. 3rd century BC
- Predecessor: Amantekha (?)
- Successor: Arnekhamani (?)
Royal titulary
- Burial: Meroë

Shesepankhenamen Setepenre is the Horus name of an otherwise unknown king of Kush, ruling from Meroë in the second half of the 3rd century BCE. His personal name is unknown. The Horus name is known only from fragmentary inscriptions on a stray block in Meroë's northern cemetery. No burial site has been identified for this king.

He is conventionally placed in the chronology of Kushite rulers as the successor of Amantekha and the predecessor Arnekhamani, ruling Kush as a contemporary of Ptolemy III Euergetes in Egypt.
