= Amaniastabarqa =

Kushite king of Meroë

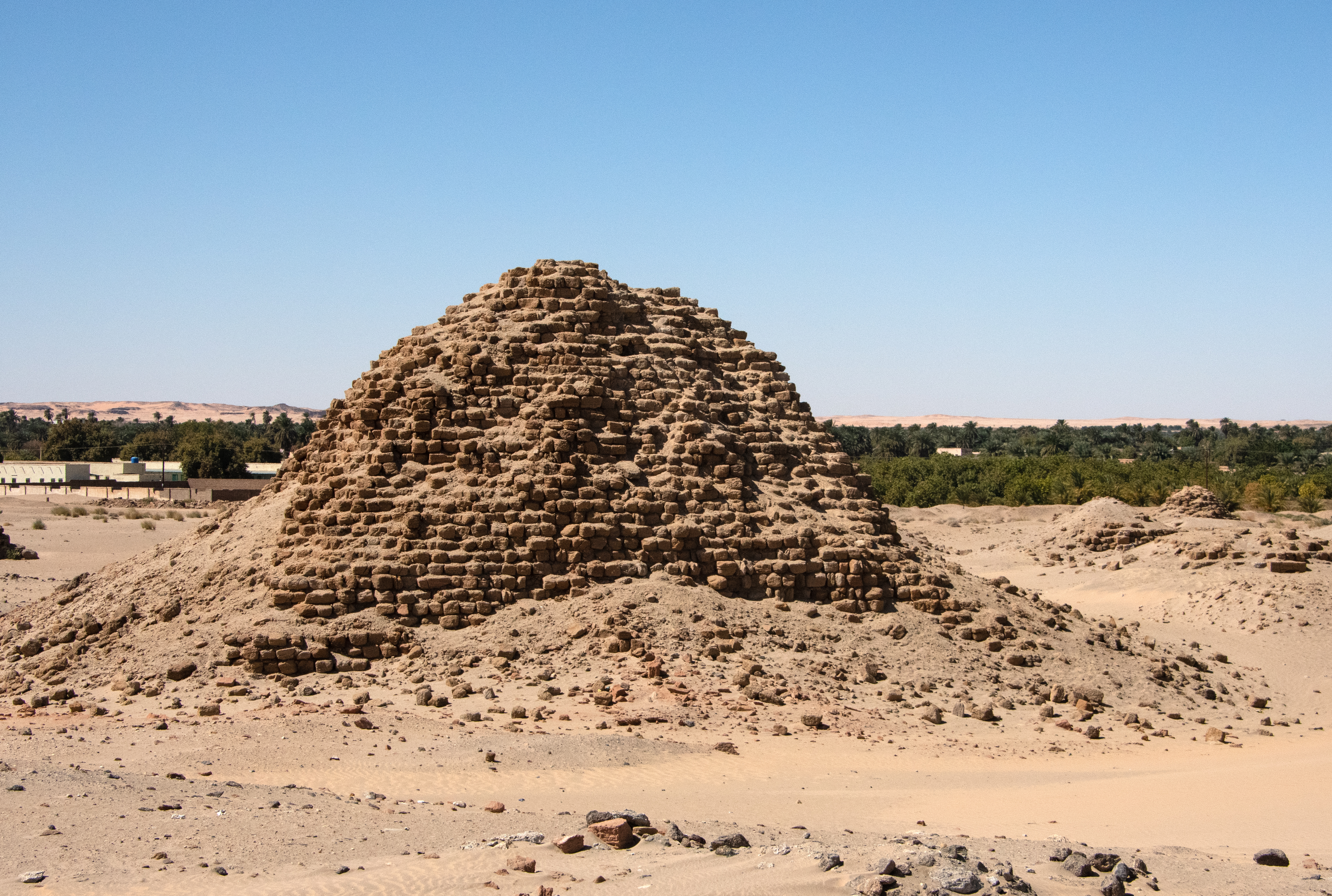
- Nuri Pyramid II of King Amaniastabarqa

Kushite King of Meroë
- Reign: 510–487 BCE
- Predecessor: Karkamani
- Successor: Siaspiqa
Royal titulary
Horus name
Swtj (?)
Prenomen
Setepkare
Ra is one whose ka is choice
Alternative reading:
Sehetepkare
The Ka of Ra pacifies

M23 X1 L2 X1	N5 stp kA
Nomen
Amaniastabarqa

G39 N5	i mn n i s ti E10 rw q
- Died: 487 BCE?
- Burial: Nuri, pyramid 2

Amaniastabarqa (also Amaniastabarqo) was a Kushite king of Meroë who ruled in the late Sixth or early Fifth centuries BC, c. 510–487 BCE.

== Reign ==
He is the presumed successor of Karkamani, according to the sequence of the Nubian pyramids at Nuri where he was buried (no. 2). The pyramid was excavated by a Harvard University-Boston Museum of Fine Arts Expedition in 1917. As a result, many of the object belonged to him are now in Boston, including ushabtis, pottery, foundation deposits, stone objects and gold artifacts. A granite gneiss stela bearing Amaniastabarqa's cartouches, again from Nuri, is now in Boston too (acc. no. 17-2-1910B).
Other artifacts of him are in the Antiquities Museum of Khartoum, noticeably a gold pectoral.

Preceded by Karkamani	Rulers of Kush; Meroitic Period	Succeeded by Siaspiqa
