= Karkamani =

Kushite king, r. c. 519–510 BC

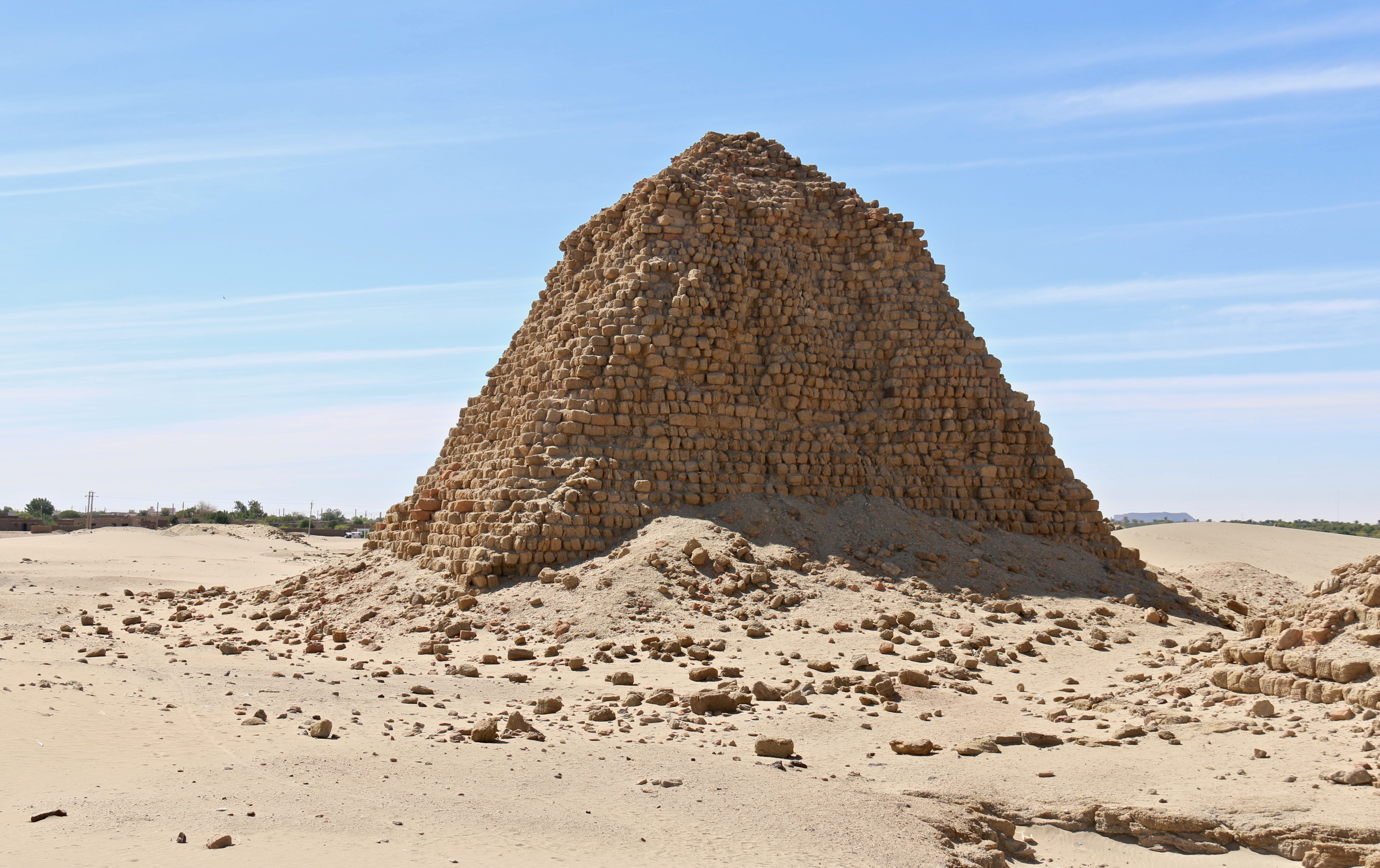
- Karkamani's pyramid, Nuri, Sudan

Kushite king of Meroë
- Reign: c. 519–510 BC
- Predecessor: Amaninatakilebte
- Successor: Amaniastabarqa
Royal titulary
Nomen
Karkamani

G39 N5	i mn n E1 E23 Z1 D28 U17
- Burial: Nuri (Nu. 7)

Karkamani was a Meroitic king who ruled in the 6th century, probably between 519 and 510 BC at Napata. He succeeded King Amaninatakilebte and was in turn succeeded by King Amaniastabarqa. Like others of his dynasty, he was discovered buried among the pyramid chambers at Nuri, specifically Nuri 7.

Preceded by Amaninatakilebte	Rulers of Kush	Succeeded by Amaniastabarqa
