= Amanislo =

King of Nubians

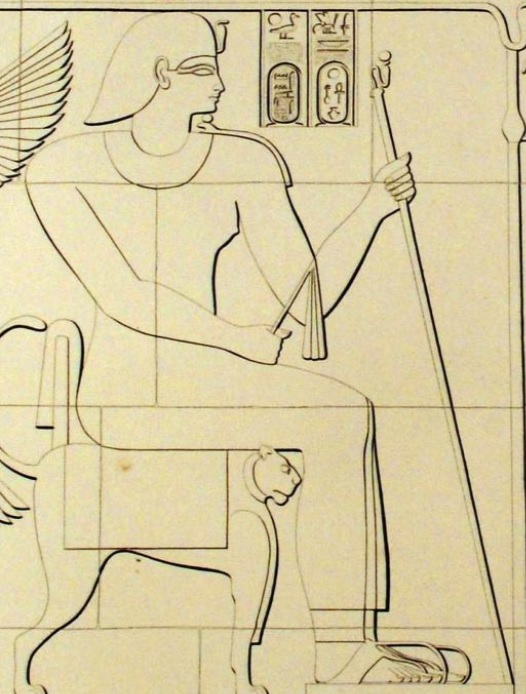
- Amanislo as depicted in his tomb (Beg. S 5)

Kushite king of Meroë
- Reign: Middle 3rd century BCE
- Predecessor: Arakamani
- Successor: Amantekha
Royal titulary
Prenomen
Ankhneferibre
Neferibre lives

M23 X1 L2 X1	N5 anx nfr ib
Nomen
Amanislo(-meryamun)
Amanislo(, beloved of Amun)

G39 N5	i mn n i s r wA
- Burial: Meroe, Beg. S 5

Amanislo was a king of Kush dating to the middle of the third century BCE.

== Monuments and inscriptions ==
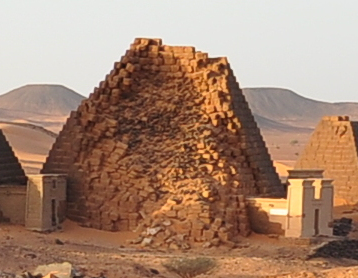
Pyramid of King Amanislo, Meroë Southern Cemetery

Amanislo is mainly known from his pyramid at Meroë. He is buried in Meroe, Beg. S 5. From the position of his pyramid it has been argued that he was the successor of king Arakamani and the predecessor of Amantekha.

He is also known from an inscription on granite lion figures, the Prudhoe Lions, originally belonging to the Egyptian pharaoh Amenhotep III and now at the British Museum. There is also a column drum, found at Semna perhaps providing his name, although the reading is uncertain.

== In modern culture ==
Amanislo appears as Amonasro, King of Ethiopia in Verdi's Aida, following the scenario written by Auguste Mariette.

== Literature ==
- Laszlo Török, in: Fontes Historiae Nubiorum, Vol. II, Bergen 1996, p. 568-569, ISBN 82-91626-01-4
