= Arqamani =

Kushite King of Meroë

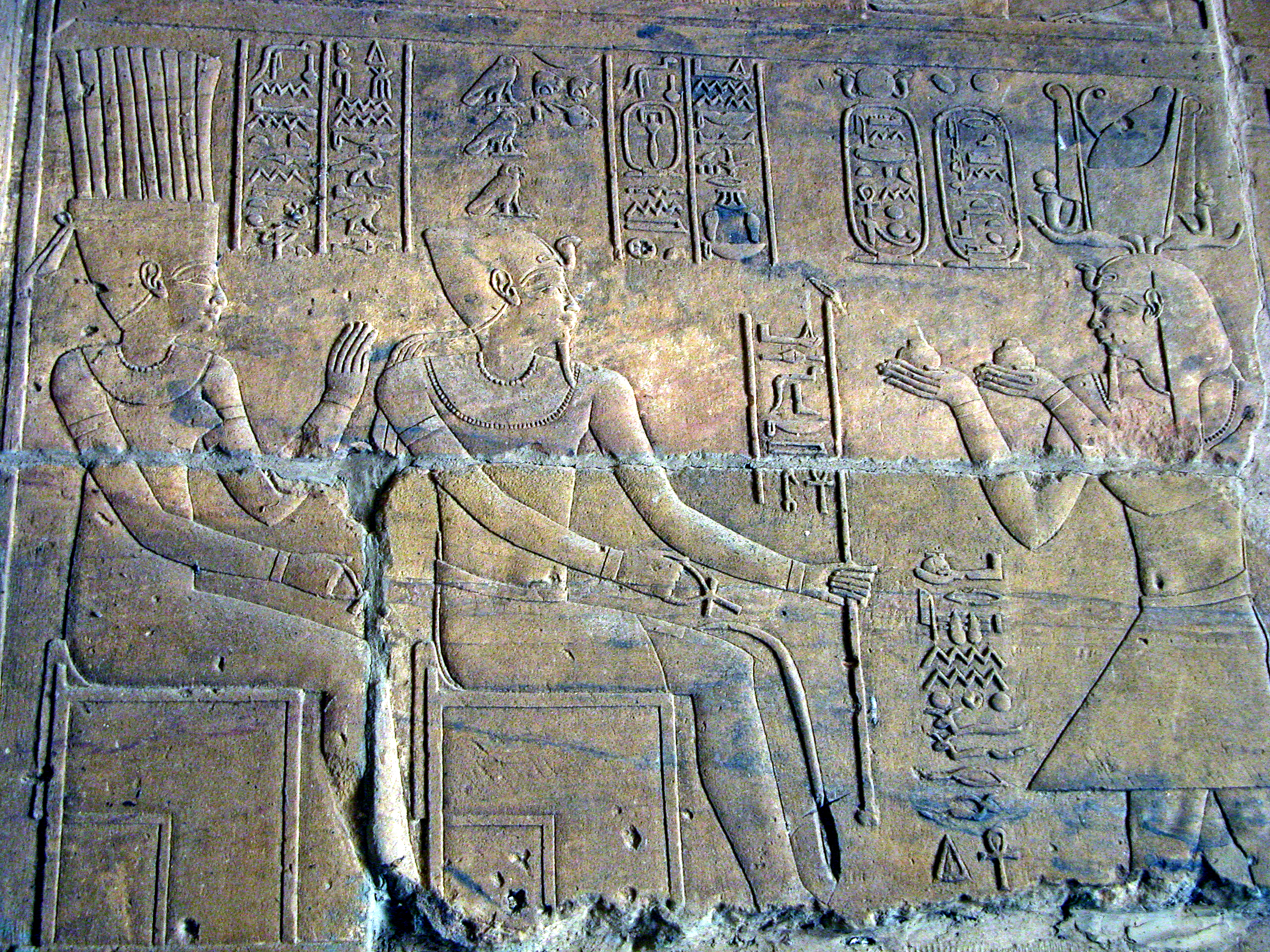
- Arqamani (right) presenting an offering, from the Temple of Dakka

Kushite king of Meroë
- Reign: c. 215—205 BCE
- Predecessor: Arnekhamani
- Successor: Adikhalamani
Royal titulary
Horus name
Djeret-netjer-en-perefkai(...)ef-Setepenamunre-suab-tawy
The God's Hand in his temple, Whose arm is raised (...),
Chosen of Amun-Ra to purify the Two Lands.
Prenomen
< i mn n d t Z1 S34 n Aa1 N5 D17 >
Djeretankhamun titre
Ḏrt-ˁnḫ-Jmn Tjt-Rˁ
Living hand of Amun, image of Ra
Nomen
< i r q i mn n S34 D t N16 Q1 t H8 U6 >
Arqamani ankhdjet meriaset
'rk-Jmn-ˁnḫ-ḏt-mrj-ȝst
Arqamani, given life, beloved of Isis
- Died: c. 205 BCE
- Burial: Pyramid at Meroë: Beg. N 7

Arqamani (also Arkamani or Ergamenes II) was a Kushite King of Meroë dating from the late 3rd to early 2nd century BCE.

== Biography ==
It is believed that Arqamani ruled in Meroë at the time of the Egyptian revolt of Horwennefer against Ptolemy IV Philopator (reign 221–204 BC). He is attested by a number of inscriptions and reliefs from Kalabsha, Philae and the Temple of Dakka. In the latter locality, he usurped some donation inscriptions originally inscribed for Ptolemy IV. He was buried in a pyramid in Meroë now known as Beg. N 7.

Arqamani took an elaborate ancient Egyptian royal titulary (see infobox) which likely reflects his control above the reconquered Lower Nubia and its inhabitants. He also took mortuary names: the mortuary Horus name is Kashy-netjery-kheper, meaning "The Kushite whose coming into being is divine", while his nomen is accompanied by the epithet Ankhdjet-meriaset, meaning "Given life, beloved of Isis", as well as Mkltk Istrk which is written in Meroitic script and whose meaning is not known.

He was sometimes tentatively identified with the king Ergamenes mentioned by Diodorus Siculus but modern scholars now believe that an earlier king with a similar name, Arakamani, is a better candidate for this identification. Nevertheless, Arqamani is sometimes called Ergamenes II.

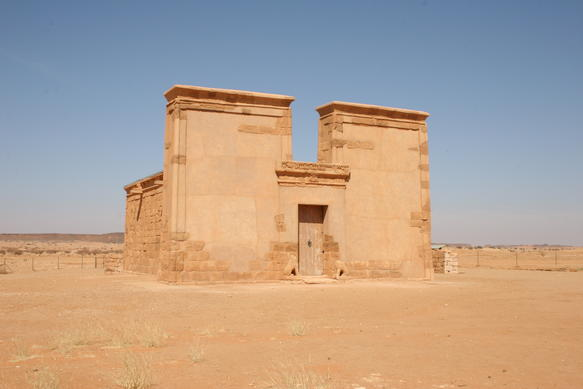
Temple of Apedemak in Musawwarat es-sufra, built by Arnekhamani

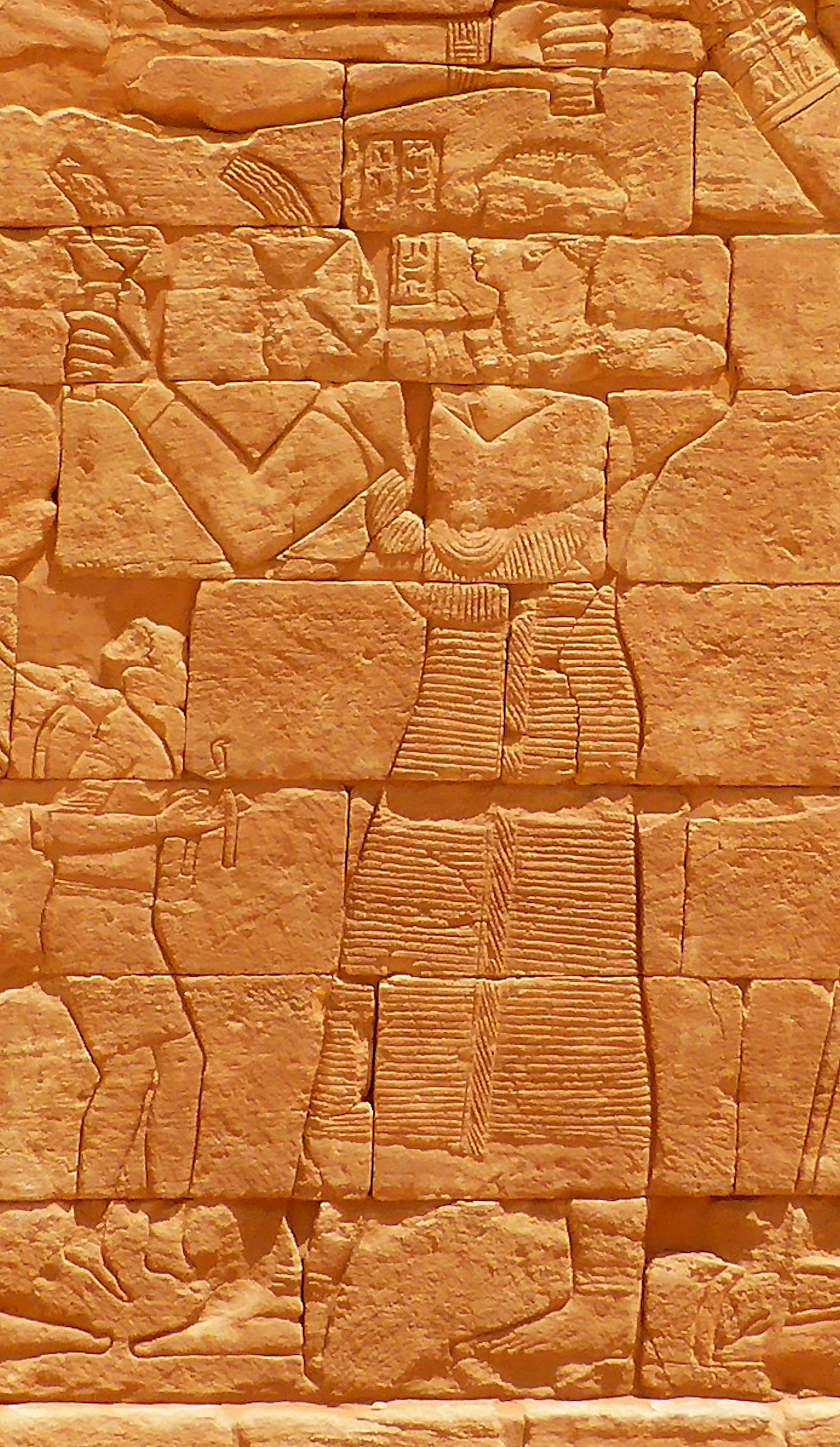
Prince Arka, son of Arnekhamani, and possibly identical with Arqamani.

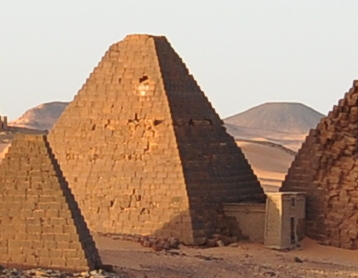
Pyramid of King Arqamani, Meroe Northern Cemetery

== See also ==
- List of monarchs of Kush

== Further reading and Bibliography ==
- Török, László (1996). Fontes Historiae Nubiorum. Vol. II. Bergen. ISBN 8291626014., pp. 660–662
- Török, László (2008). Between Two Worlds: The Frontier Region Between Ancient Nubia and Egypt 3700 BC - 500 AD. Brill. ISBN 978-90-04-17197-8.
