= Prudhoe Lions =

Ancient Egyptian monumental sculptures

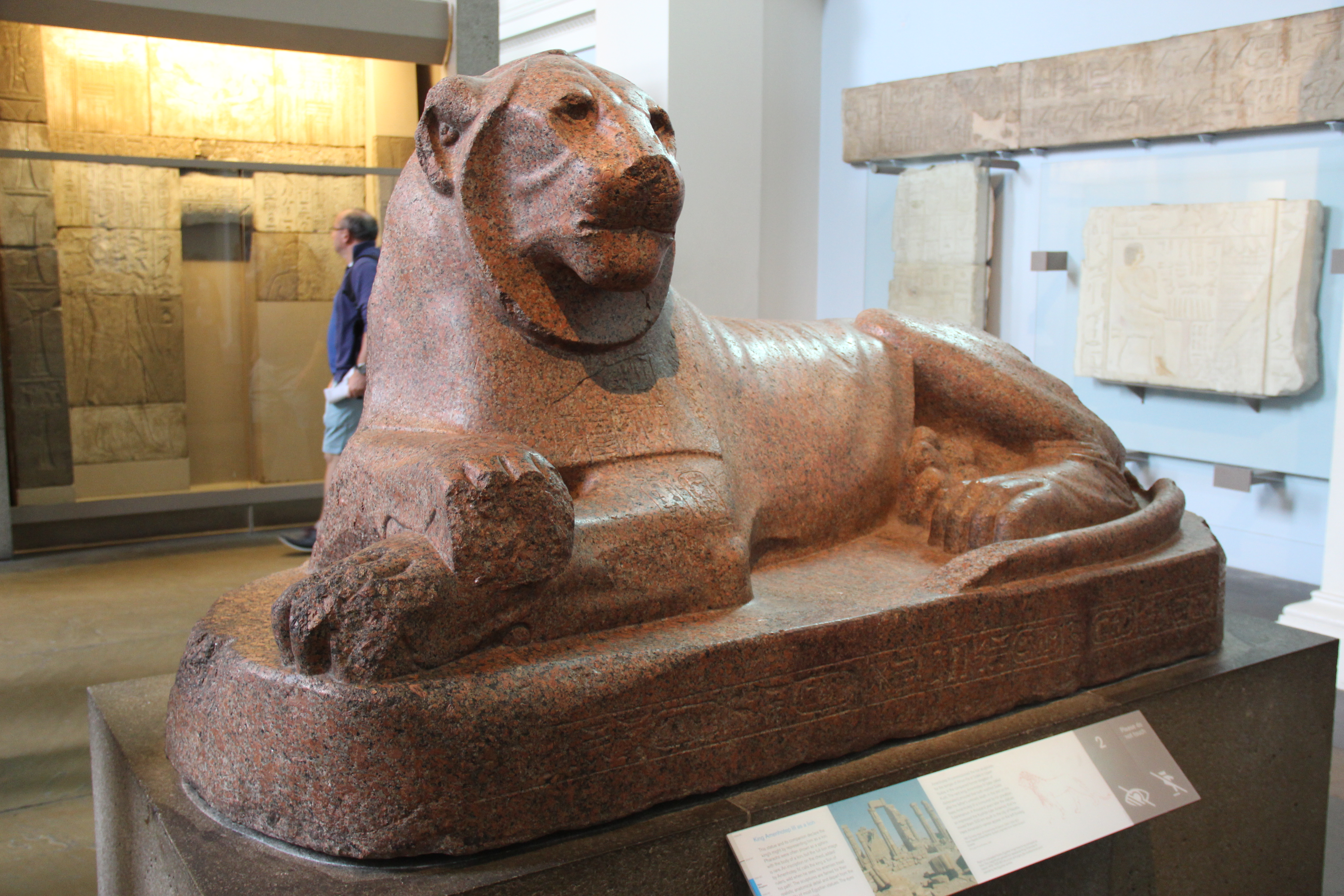
The Prudhoe Lions in the British Museum

The Prudhoe Lions, or Soleb Lions, are a pair of Ancient Egyptian red granite monumental sculptures dating from the 18th Dynasty, c. 1370 BC. They are now presented in the British Museum. The lions originally stood as guardian figures at the Temple of Soleb in Nubia, which was built by the 18th Dynasty King Amenhotep III.

As expected of statues of such grandeur, the lions bear numerous inscriptions documenting their reuse by different rulers. The original inscriptions relate to the pharaoh Amenhotep III. The renewal of the temple by Tutankhamun is also recorded: "he who renewed the monument of (or 'for') his father, the King of Upper and Lower Egypt, Lord of the Two Lands, Nebmare, image of Re, Son of Re, Amenophis, Ruler of Thebes" Another inscription indicates that they were moved by Ay, Tutankhamun's successor. In the 3rd century BC, the lions were moved to Jebel Barkal, a city to the south of the country by Amanislo, a Kushite king of Meroë. Following tradition, Amanislo also had his names engraved on the lions.

In the early nineteenth century AD the lions were collected at Jebel Barkal by Lord Prudhoe, who had them shipped to Cairo and further on to London. According to the museum's blog on how objects came to be in the collection, "The British Consul General in Cairo helped secure the necessary firmans (permissions) from the authorities. Lord Prudhoe then donated the lions to the British Museum in 1835." The pair share the registration number EA 2.

The lions measure approximately 1.20m high and 2.20m long. They are in a relaxed, naturalistic pose, lying on their sides with their heads turned to the side and their front paws crossed, rather than in the stiffer traditional pose of the sphinx or lion, with its head facing forwards and paws extended to the front.

== Reading ==
- Edwards, I.E.S. "The Prudhoe Lions, Liverpool" Annals of Archaeology and Anthropology, 26, p. 3-9
- T.G.H. James and W.V. Davies, Egyptian sculpture (London, The British Museum Press, 1983)
- A.P. Kozloff and B.M. Bryan, Egypt's dazzling sun: Amenhotep (Cleveland Museum of Art, 1992)
- Ruffle, John, "The journeys of Lord Prudhoe and Major Orlando Felix in Egypt, Nubia and the Levant; 1826-29" Travellers in Egypt edited by Paul Starkey and Janet Starkey. London: I.B. Tauris, 1998, p. 75-84
- Ruffle, John, "Lord Prudhoe and his lions" Sudan & Nubia: the Sudan Archaeological Research Society Bulletin 2 (1998) p. 82-87
- Ruffle, John, "Lord Prudhoe and Major Felix: Hieroglyphiseurs Décidés" Egyptian Encounters (Cairo Papers in Social Science 23, no. 3 (2000))
- E.R. Russmann, Eternal Egypt: masterworks of (University of California Press, 2001)
- N. Strudwick, Masterpieces of Ancient Egypt, London 2006, pp. 158–9
