= Arnekhamani =

King of Nubia

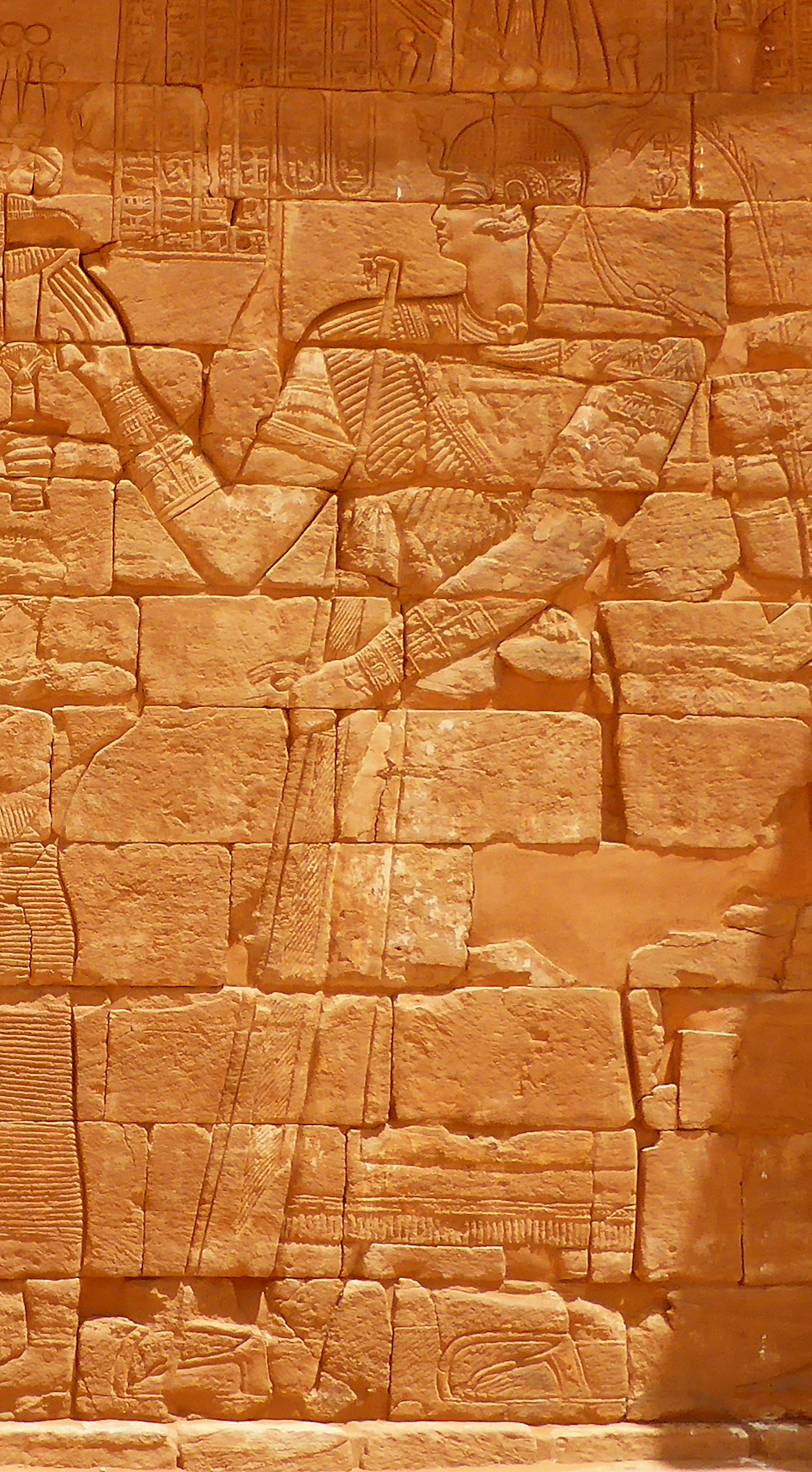
- King Arnekhamani in Apedemak temple in Musawwarat es-sufra.

Kushite king of Meroë
- Reign: 220—215 BCE
- Predecessor: Shesepankhenamen Setepenre
- Successor: Arqamani
Royal titulary
Horus name
Kanakht Merymaat
Strong bull, beloved of Maat
Prenomen
< ra xpr kA >
Kheperkare
Ḫpr-k3-Rˁ
The manifestation of the Ka of Ra
Nomen
< i A2 rw nw x i mn n anx D&t&N17 N36 >
Arnekhamani
- Children: Arqamani
- Born: 3rd century BCE
- Died: 215 BCE
- Burial: Pyramid at Meroë (Beg. N. 53 (?))

Arnekhamani was a Nubian king of the Kushite Kingdom in the third century BC. The king is mainly known from his building activity at the Musawwarat es-Sufra temple complex. The main temple complex at this place was built by Arnekhamani, but was never finished. Most likely the king died before completing the temples.

Three names are attested for Arnekhamani. His birth name was Arnekhamani, his throne name Kheperkare and his Horus name Kanakht Merymaat. His birthname includes several epithets that were changed in his reign. To the birth name was originally added beloved of Amun, later it was extended to may he live for ever, beloved of Amun. Finally it became may he live for ever, beloved of Isis. The Egyptian king Ptolemy IV Philopator (221–204 BC) is also called in his Egyptian name beloved of Isis and it seems possible that Arnekhamani's name was influenced by the name of the Egyptian king, providing a chronological fixpoint for the rule of Arnekhamani.

In the temple complex are also mentioned the wife of Arnekhamani and his son. The name of the wife is not preserved. The son is called Arky and bears the title Priest of Isis, of Ipeber-ankh (Musawwarat es-Sufra). The latter might be identical with king Arqamani, who was then the successor of Arnekhamani.

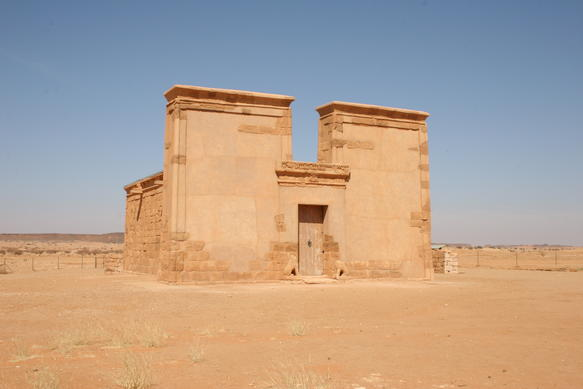
Temple of Apedemak in Musawwarat es-Sufra, built by Arnekhamani

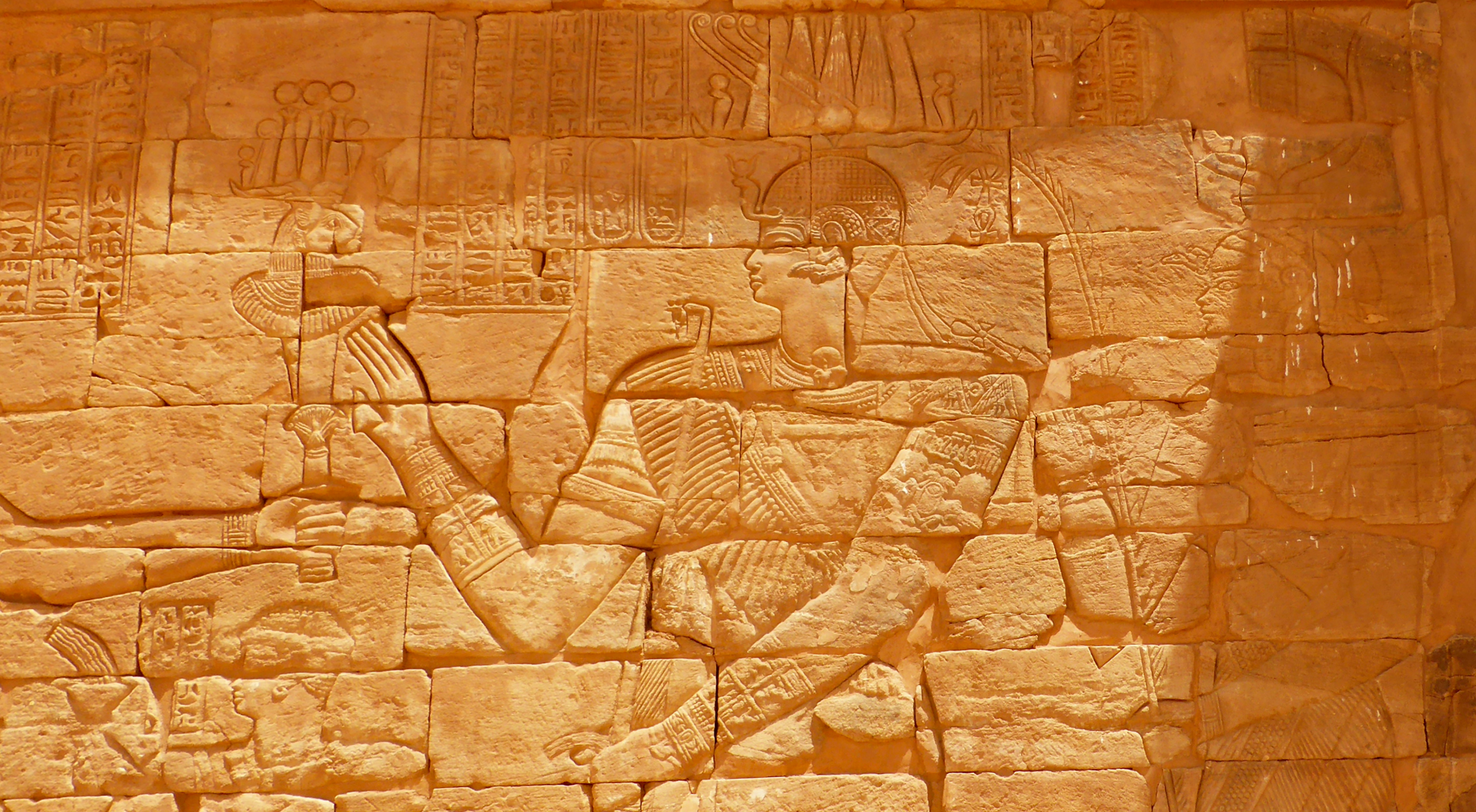
King Arnekhamani (detail)

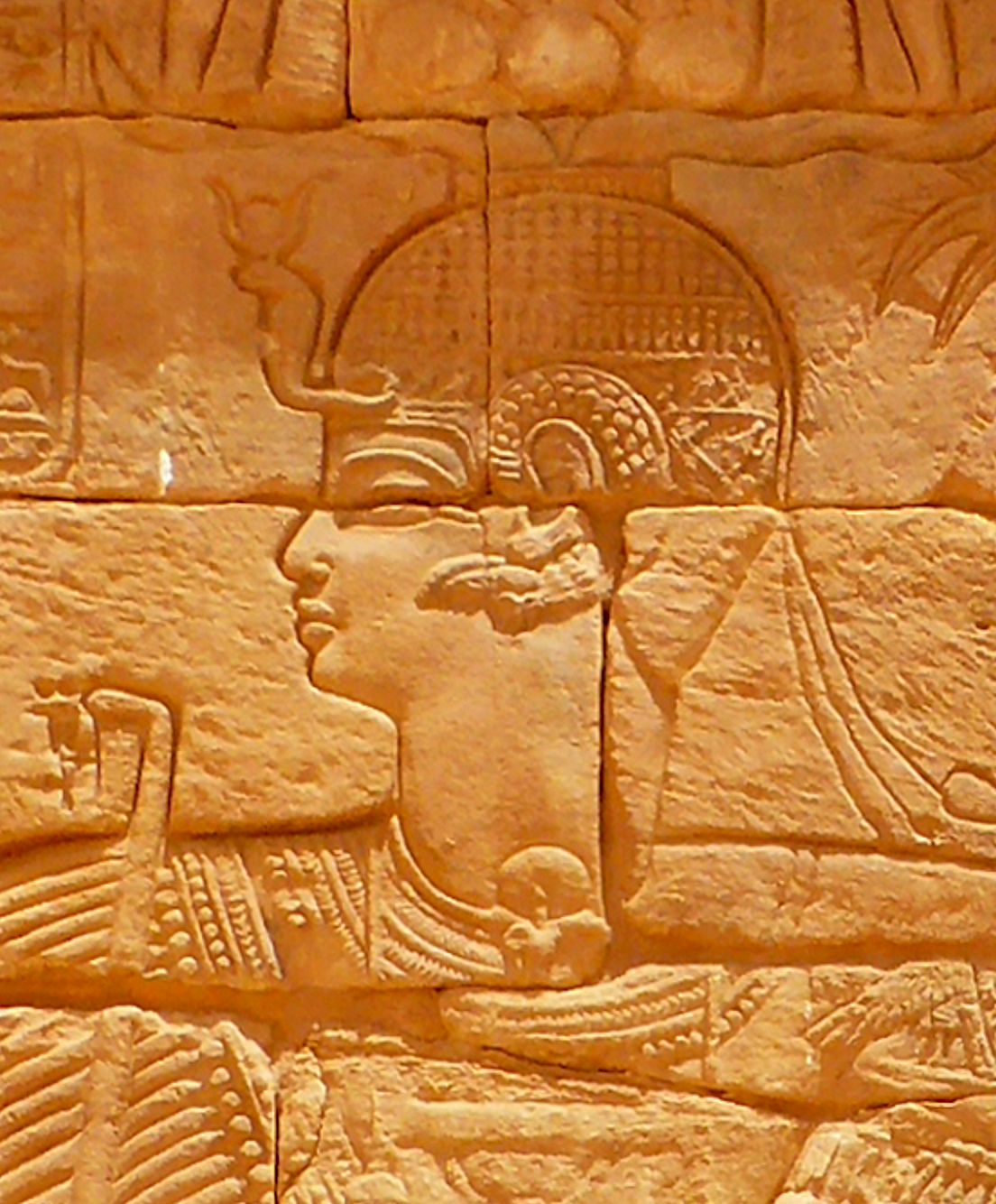
King Arnekhamani (portrait)

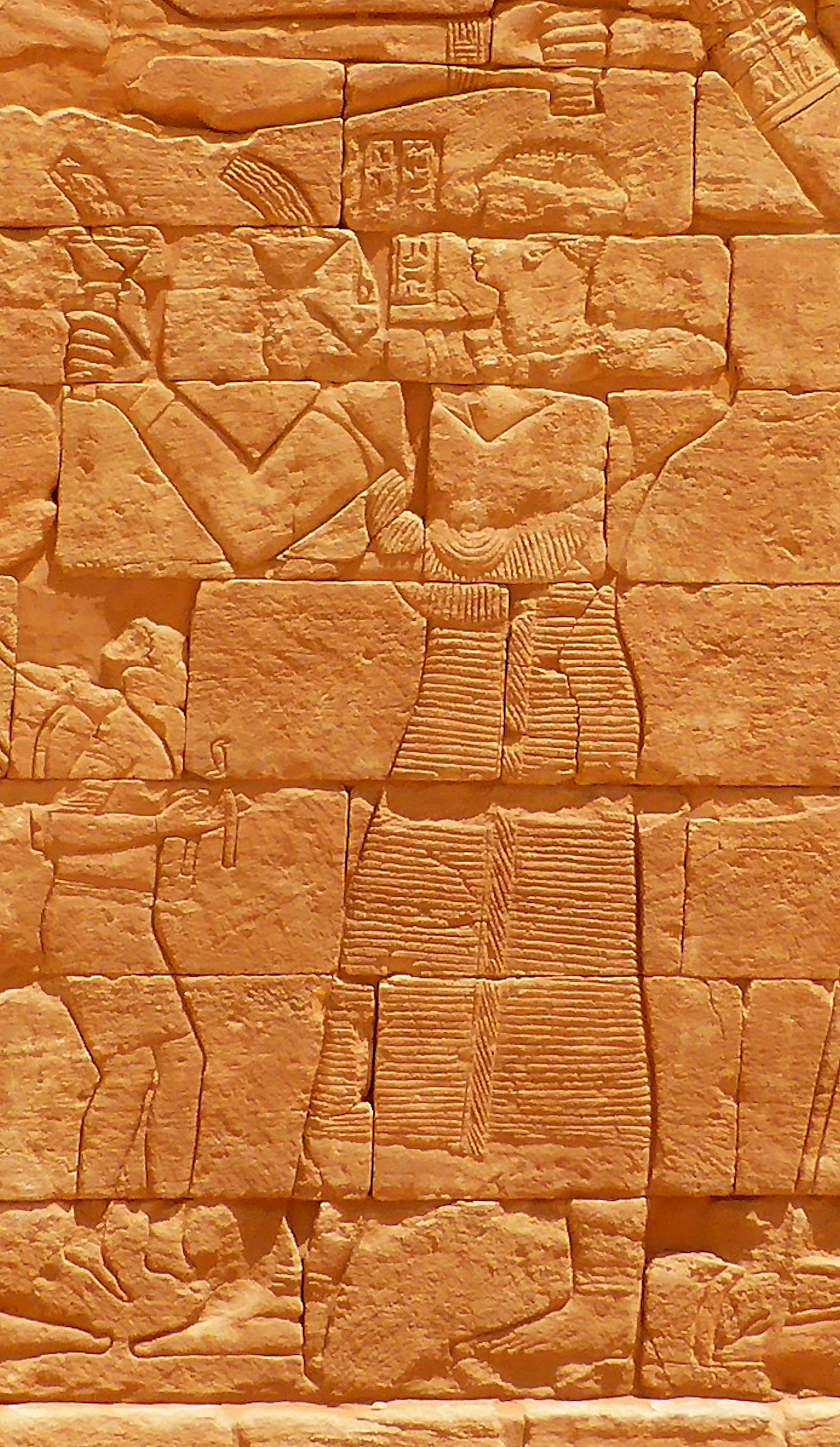
Prince Arka, son of Arnekhamani, and possible future king Arqamani.

== See also ==
- List of monarchs of Kush
