= Amantekha =

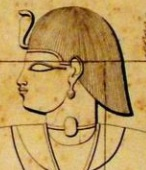
- Amantekha as depicted in his tomb

Kushite king of Meroë
- Reign: Second half of the third century BCE
- Predecessor: Amanislo (?)
- Successor: Shesepankhenamen Setepenre (?)
Royal titulary
Prenomen
Amanitecha i mn n tA a xA A
Nomen
Amantekha

G39 N5	ra ib
- Burial: Meroë, Beg. N 4

Amantekha was a king of Kush, ruling from Meroë in the second half of the third century BCE. Amantekha is known only from his tomb, Beg. N 4, which although relatively small is also the earliest known tomb from Meroë's northern cemetery. The tomb and the decoration of its chapel are not well preserved. The king's name appears on blocks from the south wall of the pyramid chapel. The throne name Menibre is only partly preserved, so that other readings are possible too.

Amantekha is conventionally placed in the chronology of Kushite rulers as the successor of Amanislo and the predecessor of an unknown king who used the Horus name "Shesepankhenamen Setepenre".
