= Teqorideamani =

Kushite King

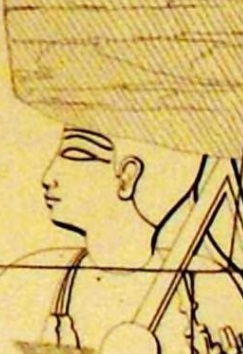
- depiction of Teqorideamani in his tomb (Beg. N. 28)

Kushite King of Meroë
- Reign: c. 253 AD
- Predecessor: Mashadakhel
- Successor: Tamelerdeamani
Royal titulary
Prenomen
Ḫpr-kꜣ-Rꜥ
Nomen
Teqorideamani
- Father: Teritnide
- Mother: Arqtñmaks
- Burial: Pyramid at Meroë (Beg N. 28)
- Dynasty: Meroitic period

Teqorideamani (also Teqoridemni or Teqerideamani) was the King of Kush who was ruling in AD 253. His reign may be dated from 245/246 to sometime after 265/266. His throne name, attested in Egyptian hieroglyphics, was Ḫpr-kꜣ-Rꜥ, meaning "Ra is one whose ka came into being". His Meroitic given name, Teqorideamani, is attested in Meroitic hieroglyphs in his tomb inscription.

Teqorideamani's reign is attested in dedicatory inscriptions on three statue bases from the Apedemak temple M6 in Meroë.

The most important monument of Teqorideamani, however, is an inscription bearing his name in demotic Egyptian in the temple of Isis at Philae. The inscription is dated 10 April 253, during Teqorideamani's second regnal year and during the reign of the Roman emperor Trebonianus Gallus. The inscription was commissioned by a Kushite official named Pasan, who in Teqorideamani's first and second years was his official representative at the Choiakh Festival of Isis in Philae. In 253, he was accompanied by Abratoye, peseto of Lower Nubia. In 260, Abratoye and the corn-measurer Tami reached an agreement with the Egyptian priests that recognised the Kushite king's authority over the temple.

Another inscription at Philae is dated to the twentieth regnal year of an unnamed Kushite king. There are several reasons to date this inscription to about 265/266. Inge Hofmann assigns it to Teqorideamani.

Teqorideamani was buried at Meroë in pyramid Beg.N.28. In 1955, A. J. Arkell suggested that the pyramid belonged to an earlier king of the same name. Although he abandoned this hypothesis by 1961, it was taken up by Steffen Wenig in 1967. Wenig assigns Beg.N.28 to the 2nd century and suggests that Teqorideamani I reigned from about 90 until 114. The discovery in the tomb of an inscribed olive oil amphora from Tubusuctu is more consonant with a 3rd-century date. László Török considered the hypothesis of two kings debunked in 1997, but Derek Welsby still a Teqorideamani I and Teqorideamani II in his Kushit king list the following year.

Teqorideamani was succeeded by his younger brother or half-brother, Tamelordeamani.

== Literature ==
- Eide, Tormod; Hägg, Tomas; Holton Pierce, Richard; Török, László (1998). Fontes Historiae Nubiorum: From the first to the sixth century AD. University of Bergen. ISBN 82-91626-07-3.
- Arkell, A. J. (1961) [1955]. A History of the Sudan to 1821 (2nd ed.). John de Graff.
- Desanges, Jehan (1972). "L'amphore de Tubusuctu et la datation de Teqerideamani" (PDF). Meroitic Newsletter (11): 17–21.
- Hofmann, Inge (1978). Beiträge zur meroitischen Chronologie. St. Augustin bei Bonn.
- Török, László (1997). The Kingdom of Kush: Handbook of the Napatan–Meroitic Civilization. Brill.
- Welsby, Derek A. [in German] (1998). The Kingdom of Kush. Markus Wiener.
- Wenig, Steffen [in German] (1967). "Bemerkungen zur Chronologie des Reiches von Meroe". Mitteilungen des Instituts für Orientforschung. 13: 1–44.
