= Soleb =

Ancient town in Nubia

Coordinates: 20°26′0″N 30°20′0″E

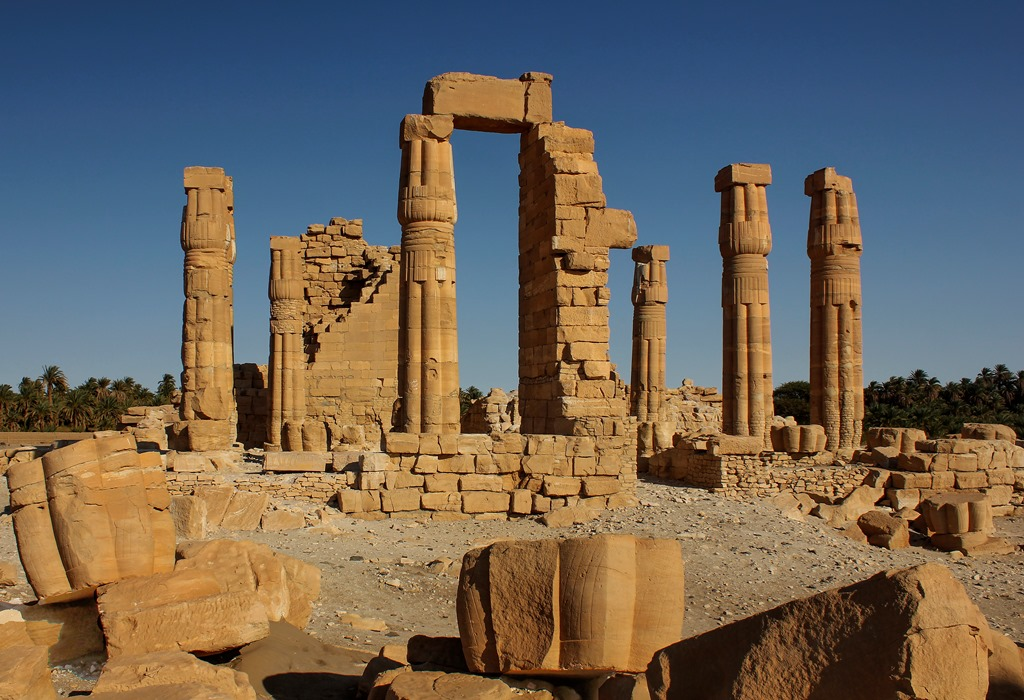
- View of the Soleb temple

- Location within Sudan
- Type: Temple
- Location: Sudan
- Region: Nubia

Site notes
- Condition: In ruins

Soleb is an ancient town in Nubia, in present-day Sudan. The site is located north of the third cataract of the Nile, on the western side of the Nile. It was discovered and described by Karl Richard Lepsius in 1844. The temple was built during the reign of Amenhotep III and dedicated to Amun, but after Akhenaten assumed power, it was rededicated to Aten.

== Necropolis ==
Soleb is also the location of a vast necropolis with small tomb chapels decorated with pyramids. The earliest royal tombs date to the 18th dynasty, whereas some belong to the Ramesside and Meroitic periods.

== Amarna Period ==
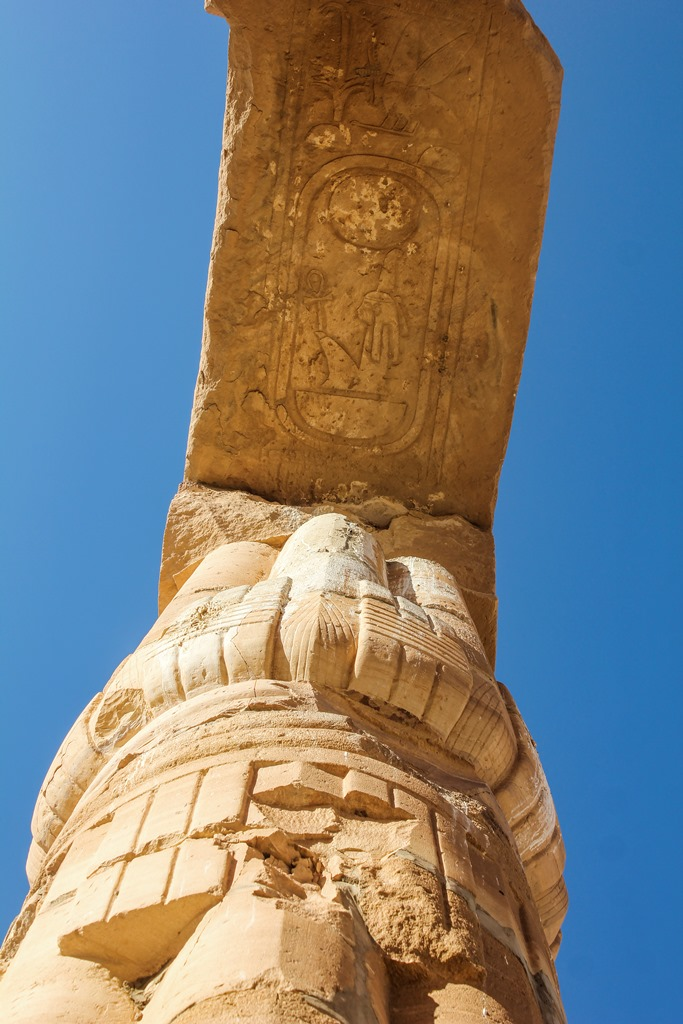
Architrave with the cartouche of Amenhotep III in the Soleb temple

During the Amarna Period (Mid 18th Dynasty), several pharaohs attended to Soleb, such as Amenhotep III, Akhenaten, Tutankhamun, and Ay.

=== Amenhotep III ===
A large temple made of sandstone was founded here by Amenhotep III. It is the southernmost temple currently known to have been built by this pharaoh. The temple was consecrated to the deity Amun Re and to the pharaoh depicted deified with ram-horns. The architect may have been Amenhotep, son of Hapu.

At Sedeinga, a companion temple was built by Amenhotep III to Queen Tiye as a manifestation of the Eye of Ra.

The so-called Prudhoe Lions originally stood as guardian figures at this temple inscribed with the name of Amenhotep III. They depict a lioness, as symbols of Sekhmet, a major deity who protected the pharaohs.

=== Akhenaten ===
During the reign of Akhenaten, he initially is shown worshipping his father and Amen at the temple. But later, he re-dedicated the temple to Aten.

=== Tutankhamen ===
During the reign of Tutankhamen, the religious reforms of his father, Akhenaten, were reversed and the temple was rededicated to Amen-Ra. Tutankhamun finished the second granite lion and inscribed his name on the Prudhoe Lions.

=== Ay ===
During the reign of Ay, he also inscribed his name on the Prudhoe Lions.

== List of imprisoned peoples ==
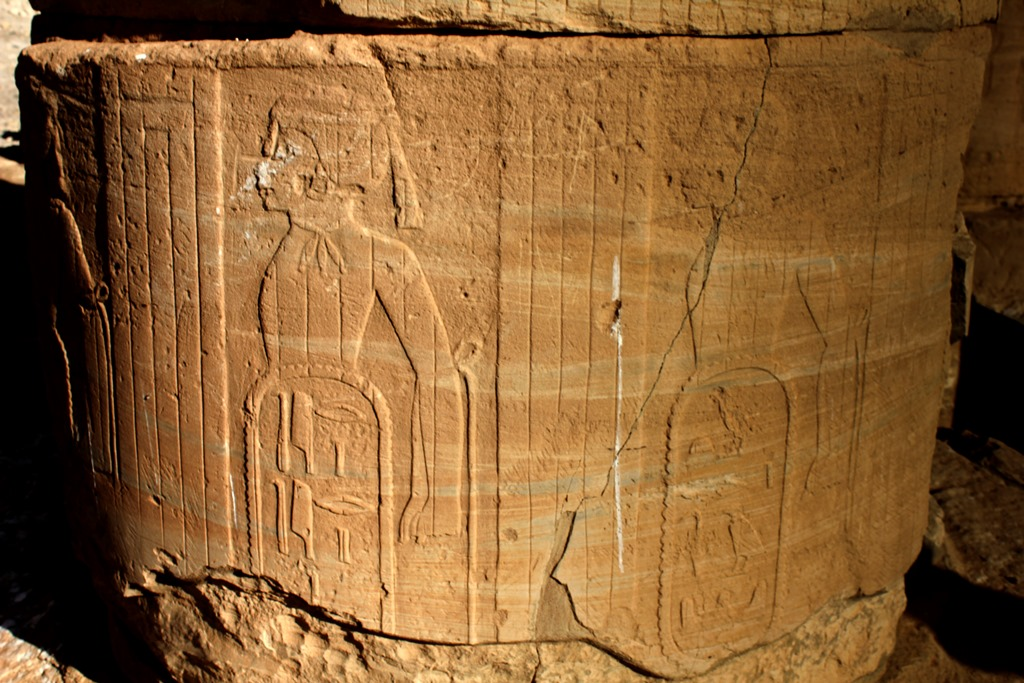
Prisoners from the hypostyle hall of the Soleb temple

Major Felix in 1829 realized an expedition of the site and recognized the inscriptions of prisoners on visible columns commemorated the victories of Amenhotep III. Jude Flurry argues that these prisoner lists may be an exaggeration or a lie about Egyptian victories, but they do show who the Egyptians' enemies were. However, sector IV of the hypostyle hall was in ruins, demolished and partially covered by sand, and was discovered centuries later. In the 1957-1963 excavation expedition led by Michela Schiff Giorgini, other parts of the temple, including the remaining inscriptions of the prisoners, were reconstructed with the identified pieces.

On the columns of the hypostyle hall, there is a list of the peoples that the Egyptians had conquered. A total of three lists are preserved with the names of foreign places and surviving people. Each list depicts the figure of a prisoner soldier with his arms tied, and with his shield. On each shield there is an inscription describing to which town and place the soldier belongs.

tA SA sw i i h wA w
Soleb inscription.

𓇾𓆷𓇓𓇋𓇋𓉔𓍯𓅱

tA SAsw yhw
in hieroglyphs

Era: New Kingdom
(1550–1069 BC)

tA SA sw w i i h Ai A
Amarah west inscription.

𓇾𓆷𓇓𓅱𓇋𓇋𓉔𓌗𓄿

tA SAsw yhwA
in hieroglyphs

Era: New Kingdom
(1550–1069 BC)

Lists

1. tꜣ šꜣsw trbr
2. tꜣ šꜣsw yhwꜣ
3. tꜣ šꜣsw smt
4. (destroyed)

Column N4

1. btꜥn/f?[...]
2. (destroyed)

Lists of Amarah-West (50 km north of Soleb)

1. tꜣ šꜣsw sꜥrr
2. tꜣ šꜣsw rbn
3. tꜣ šꜣsw pyspys
4. tꜣ šꜣsw smt
5. tꜣ šꜣsw yhwꜣ
6. tꜣ šꜣsw <t>rbr

=== tꜣ šꜣsw Yhwꜣ ===
The transcription of one of the conquered people is tꜣ šꜣsw Yhwꜣ, translated as "land of the Shasu, those of Yhwꜣ", or "land of the nomads of Yhwꜣ". Thomas Schneider vocalizes the name as Yahwa, though other vocalizations, such as Yehua, have been proposed. Fleming reports that this Yhwꜣ was located in Palestine and Syria. According to Kennedy, exactly what the name Yhwꜣ refers to has been "a matter of debate", but he concludes that it "logically follows" that the Shasu could be identified with the Israelites, given the similarity of the term with the name of the Israelite god Yahweh. Shalomi Hen, while noting the scholarly discourse around the subject, considers the evidence too scanty to allow such an identification.

== Gallery ==
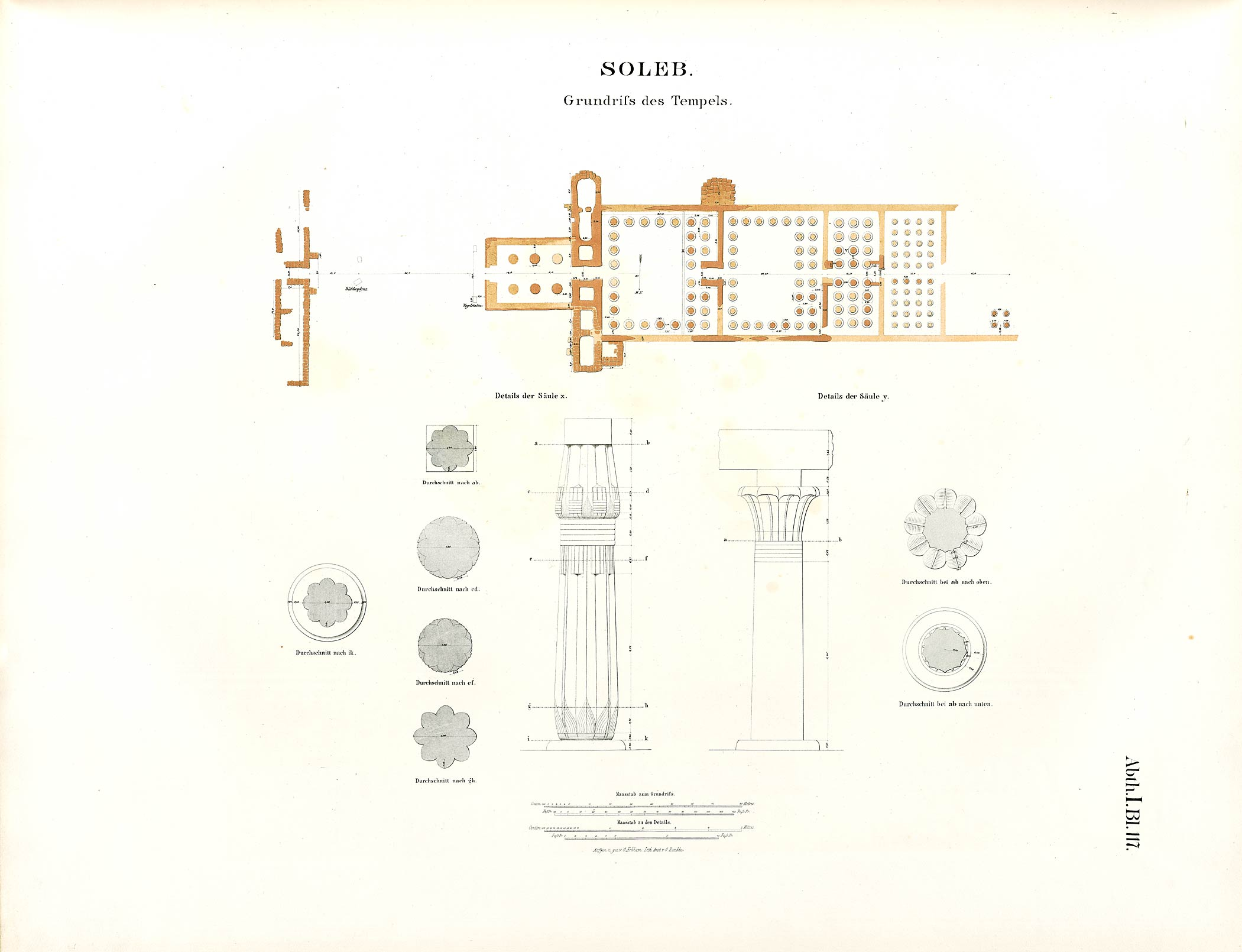
Plan of the site by Lepsius

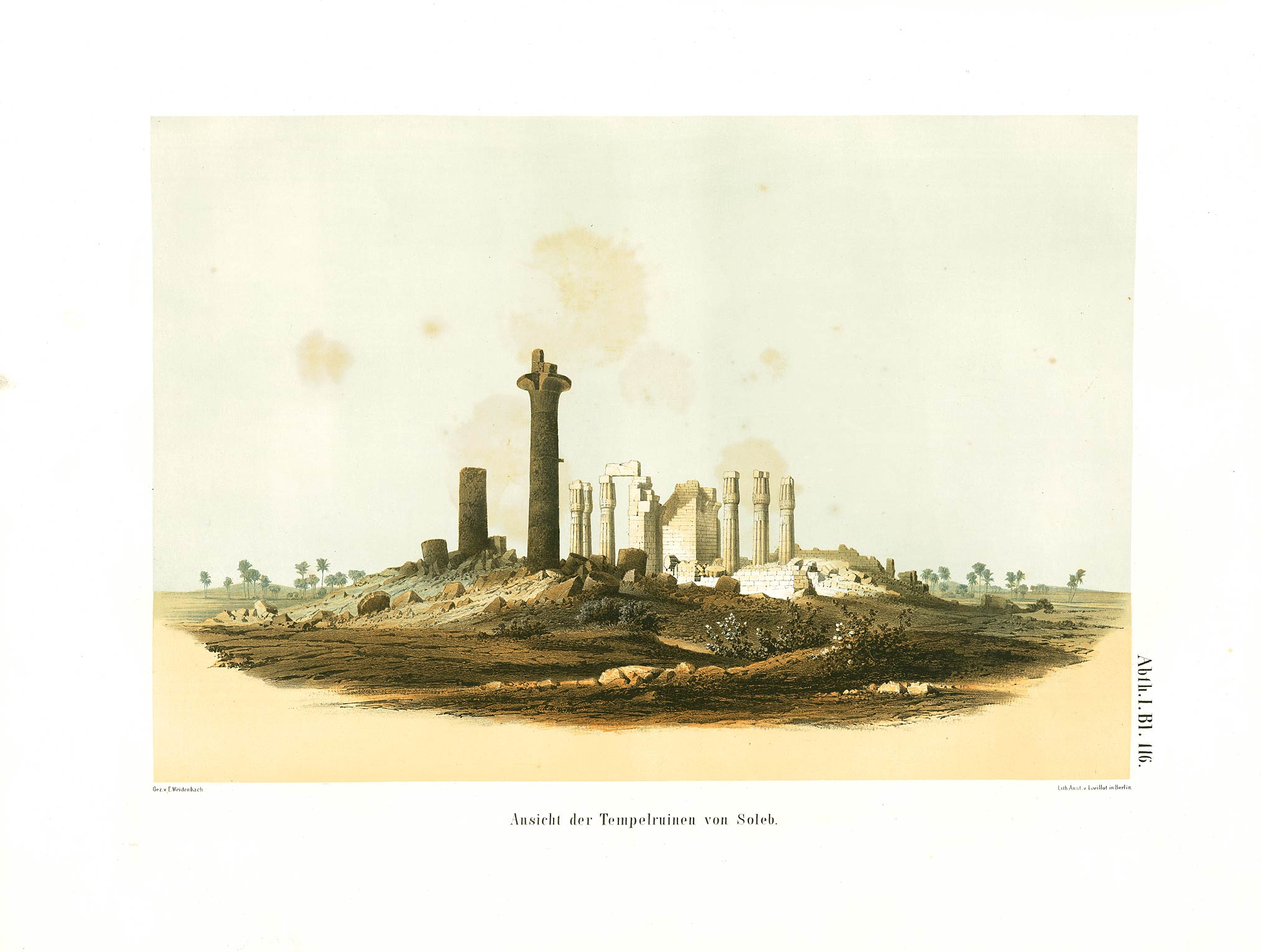
View of the temple's ruins in the 19th century

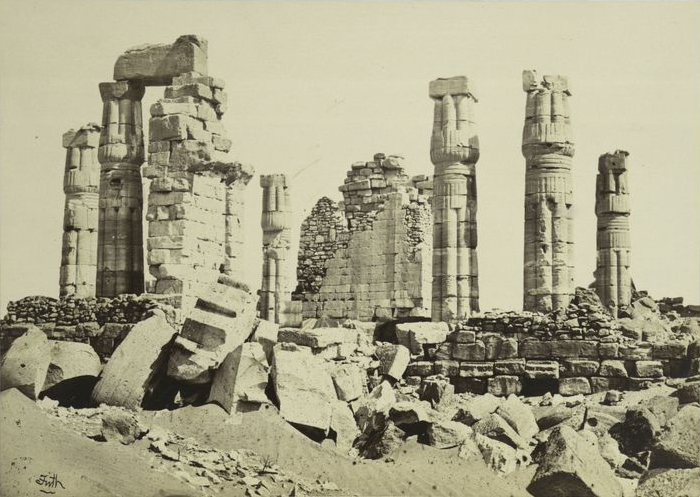
View of the temple's colonnades in the 19th century
