= Amanipilade =

Nubian queen regnant. Last queen of Kush

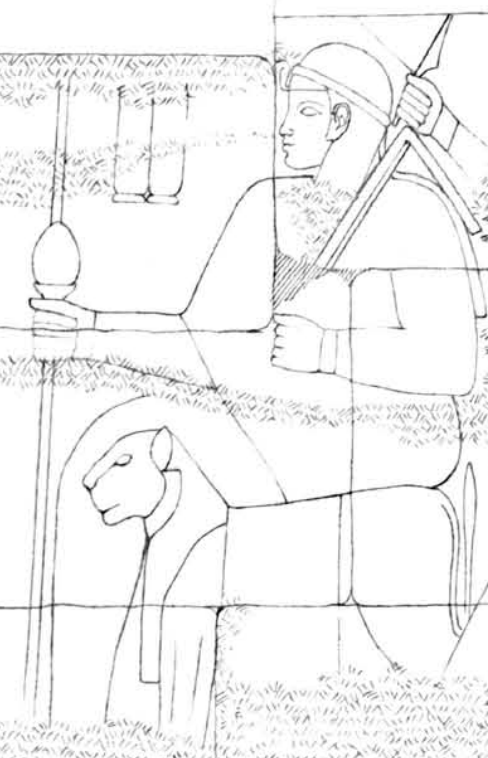
- Relief of the Kushite ruler buried in Beg N. 25, conventionally identified as Amanipilade

Kushite Queen of Meroë
- Reign: c. AD 340–350/355
- Predecessor: Patrapeamani
Royal titulary
- Died: c. AD 350/355

Amanipilade is the name conventionally attributed to a Kushite queen regnant buried in pyramid Beg N. 25 in Meroë. Amanipilade ruled the Kingdom of Kush from Meroë in the middle of the fourth century AD. Circumstantial and indirect evidence suggests that she might have been the last ruler of the kingdom.

== Sources and chronology ==
The name Amanipilade, rendered in Meroitic as Mnipilde, is known only from a text found at an offering table in the pyramid Beg. W 104, likely removed from its original location and placed there later. The name was attributed to the monarch buried in Beg N. 25 in 1978, based on the late type of the text's palaeography matching the very late date of the pyramid. The attribution of Amanipilade to Beg N. 25 is conventionally accepted by scholars, for instance in the Fontes Historiae Nubiorum and by Török (2015). Some researchers have doubted the attribution, such as Kuckertz (2021), who speculated that it could be the name of a non-royal official who adopted a royal formula on their offering table. Like many other Kushite rulers, the name Amanipilade incorporates the name of the god Amun. The names of Amanipilade's parents are also recorded in the offering table text: Tehye (father) and Mkeḫñye (mother). These names are not attested as belonging to any ruling Kushite monarchs but the Kushite throne could be inherited through indirect lines.

Amanipilade was identified as a female ruler through the name's connection to Beg N. 25. The pyramid's mortuary chapel includes a relief depicting the monarch buried, which is conventionally interpreted as depicting a ruling queen, relatively common in the late Kingdom of Kush. Because the reliefs are damaged, it has been suggested that this is an "unsafe interpretation of relief traces". Recent works however generally maintain that Beg N. 25 is the tomb of a queen regnant, though some stress that this is a cautious identification.

Beg N. 25 is the last known royal burial in Meroë and may thus mark the end of the royal dynasty that ruled from that city. Circumstantial and indirect evidence also dates the end of Meroitic political authority to the middle decades of the fourth century AD.
