= Amanitaraqide =

Nubian King

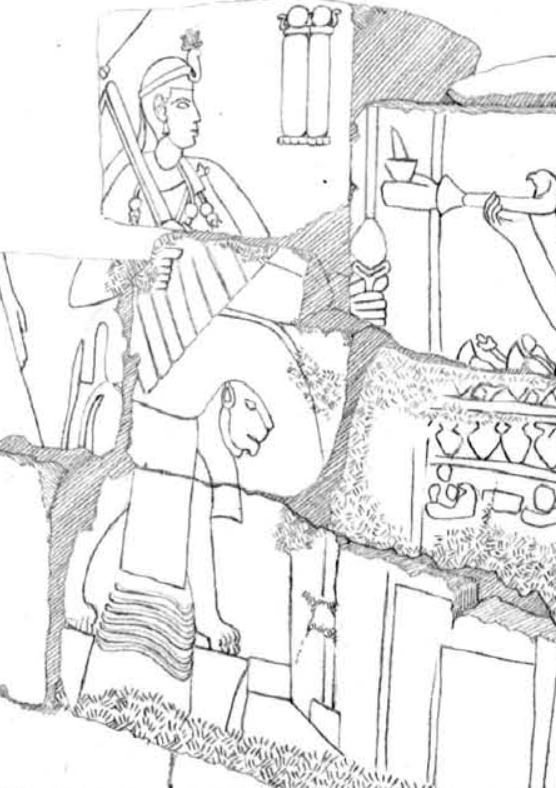
- Relief of the king buried in Beg. N 36, possibly Amanitaraqide

Kushite King of Meroë
- Reign: c. AD 1st century
- Predecessor: Aritenyesbokhe
- Successor: Amanikhedolo
Royal titulary
- Died: c. 1st century

Amanitaraqide was a king of the kingdom of Kush, ruling from Meroë. The timeframe of his reign and the location of his burial are uncertain and disputed.

== Sources and chronology ==
Amanitaraqide is known only from an inscription on an offering table, found in the pyramid Beg. N 16. The offering table mentions that he was the son of Pisakar (father) and Amankhadoke (mother); neither is attested to have ruled themselves and are therefore not believed to have been monarchs, though Amankhadoke may based on her name have been of royal descent.

Beg. N 16 was speculatively assigned as Amanitaraqide's burial in the Fontes Historiae Nubiorum. Beg. N 16 however also preserves the offering table of King Aryesbokhe. Which king was actually buried there and whose table was later inserted there is disputed. Both Török (2015) and Kuckertz (2021) instead place Amanitaraqide's burial in Beg. N 36. Fontes Historiae Nubiorum dates Amanitaraqide to the late 1st century CE based on objects found in Beg. N 16. Although Török (2015) assigned a different burial he also maintained a date in the late 1st century. Rilly & Voogt (2012) placed Amanitaraqie in the second half of the 2nd century and Kuckertz (2021) placed him at the end of the 2nd century.
