= Temple of Dakka =

Ancient Egyptian temple

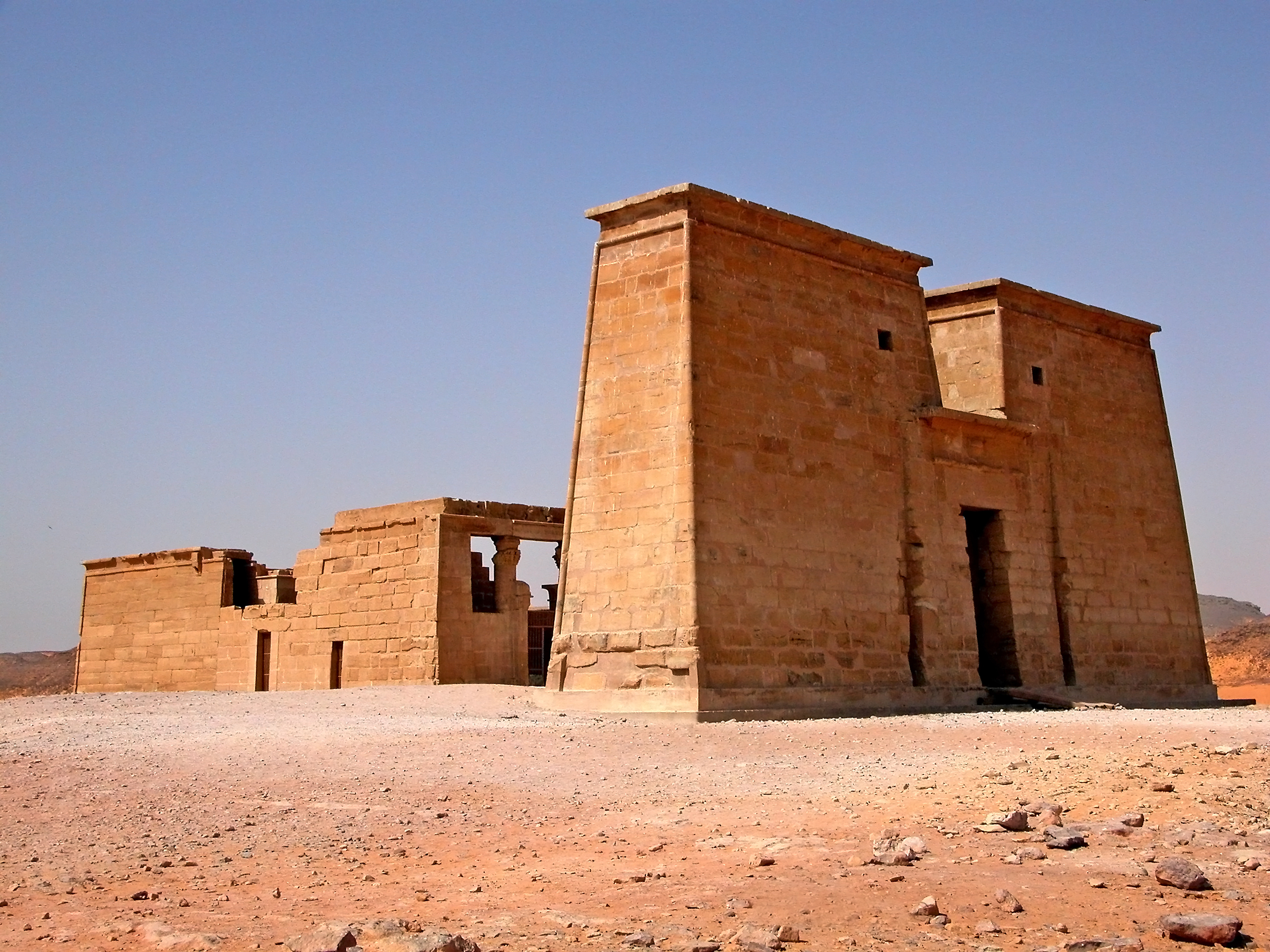
- The Temple of Dakka in Nubia

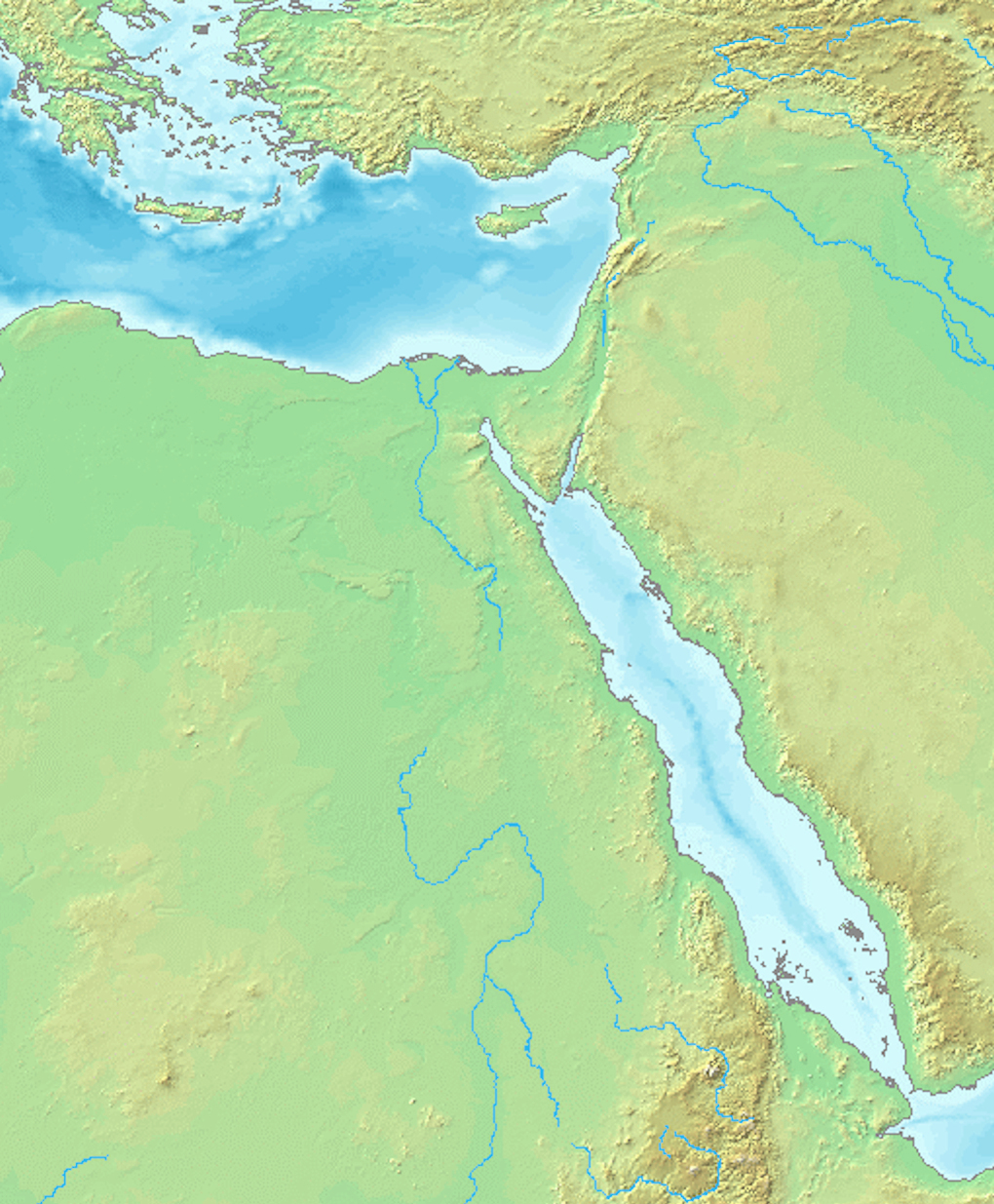
- Location within Northeast Africa Location within Egypt
- 22°48′3.59″N 32°32′44.69″E
- Type: Settlement
- Location: Egypt

Site notes
- Condition: restored

Ad-Dakka (Arab: الدكة, also el-Dakka, Egyptian: Pselqet, Greek: Pselchis) was a place in Lower Nubia. It is the site of the Greco-Roman Temple of Dakka, dedicated to Thoth, the god of wisdom in the ancient Egyptian pantheon. The temple was initially a small one-room shrine or chapel, first begun in the 3rd century BC by a Meroitic king named Arqamani (or Ergamenes II) in collaboration with Ptolemy IV who added an antechamber and a gate structure. Ptolemy IX "subsequently enlarged the temple by adding a pronaos with two rows of probably three columns." During the Roman period, the Emperors Augustus and Tiberius further enlarged the structure with "the addition, at the rear, of a second sanctuary as well as inner and outer enclosure walls with a large pylon. The sanctuary contained a granite naos." The Temple of Dakka was transformed into a temple fortress by the Romans and surrounded by a stone wall, 270 by 444 metres long, with an entrance along the Nile.

A large dromos leads to the pylon, which formed the entrance to the temple. Each of the pylon's towers is decorated in high relief and bears numerous graffiti from visitors, mostly in Greek but some in Demotic and Meroitic script. There are reliefs of cows offered as gifts to the god Thoth carved into the naos of the Temple of Dakka. While the temple of Dakka was similar architecturally to the temple of Wadi es-Sebua, it lacked a front courtyard of sphinxes; However, its 12-metre-high pylon is in near perfect condition. A 55-metre-long processional approach ran from the temple's pylon to a cult terrace at the Nile.

During the Christian period of Egypt, the facade of the pronaos was converted for use as a church, and Christian paintings were still visible here in the 20th century before the temple was enveloped by the Nile floods. In the 19th century these paintings were described as rather crude and already quite damaged representations of Christian saints.

The temple of Dakka collapsed in 1908–1909 and was subsequently rebuilt by Alessandro Barsanti via Anastylosis.

== Relocation ==
During the construction of the Aswan Dam in the 1960s, the temple was dismantled and moved to the site of New Wadi es-Sebua. In the process, the remaining Christian wall paintings were destroyed. When the temple was rebuilt at New Wadi es-Sebua, additional newly identified original fragments were added.

At the time of the temple's removal, some reused stone blocks from Thutmose III, Seti I and Merneptah were discovered which originated from an earlier New Kingdom structure in or near Kubban. The temple's pylon is now separated from the remainder of the temple due to the missing enclosure walls of the open court.

== Reliefs ==
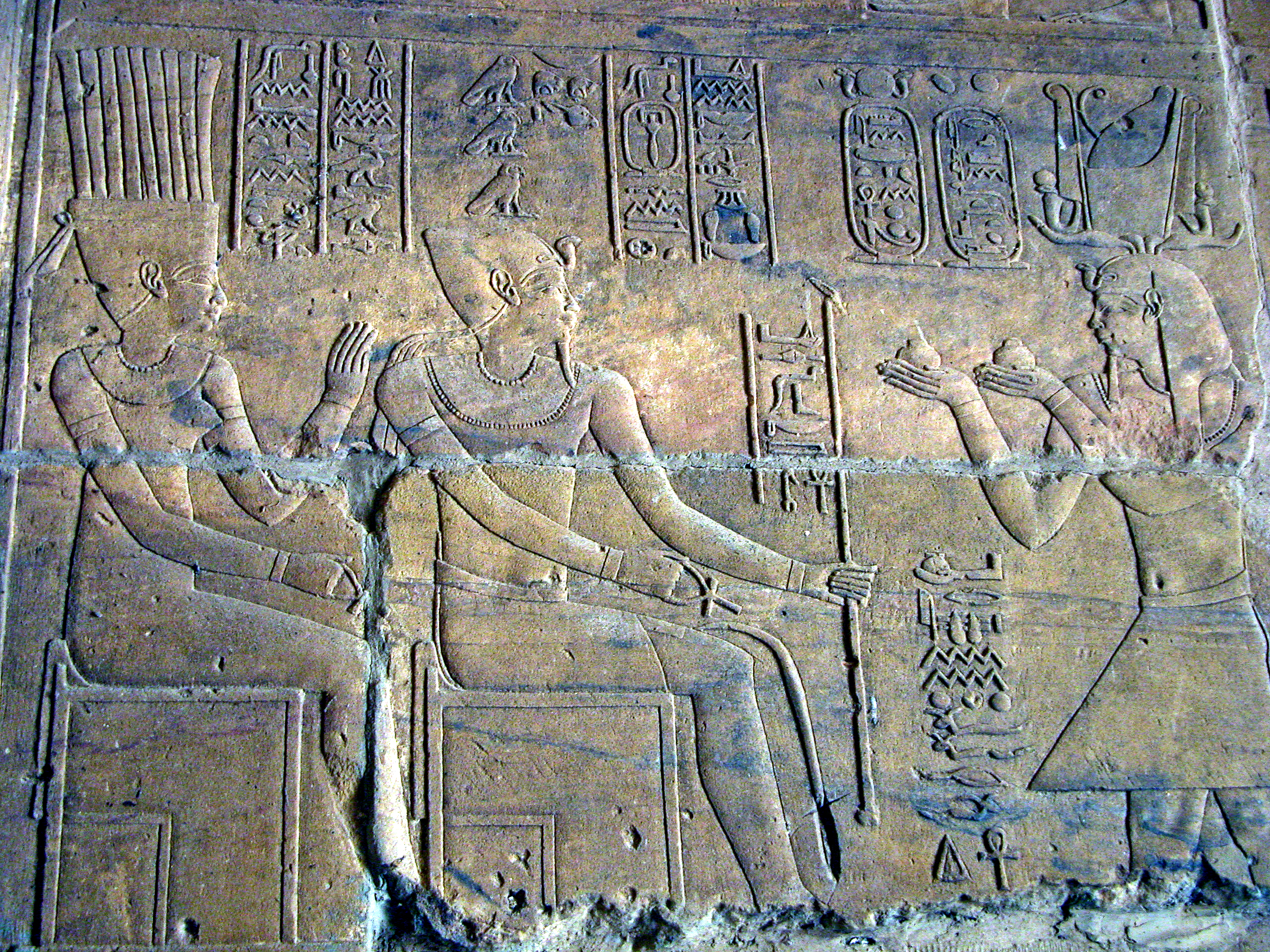
Relief depicting the Kushite king Arkamani presenting an offering to the gods

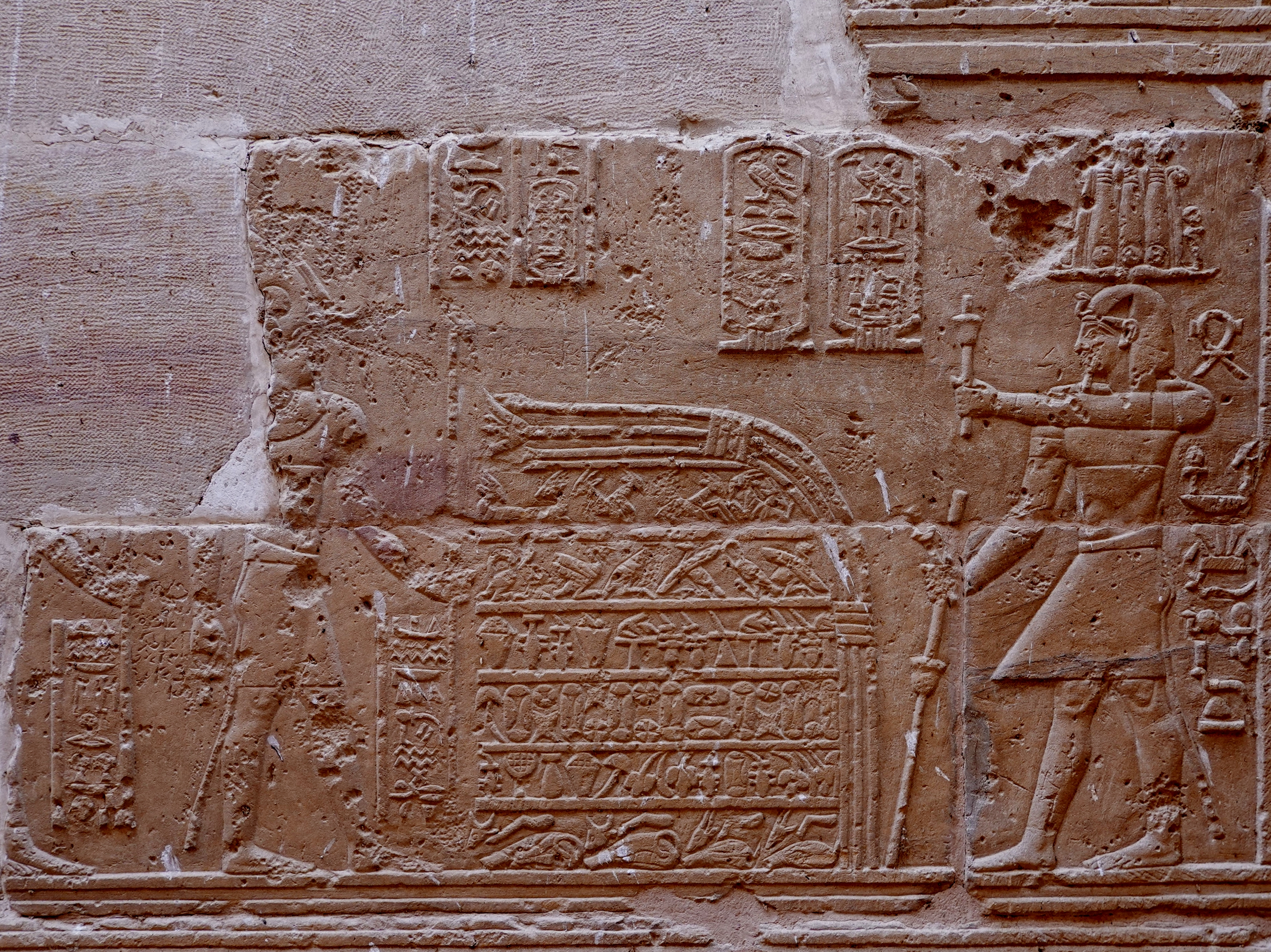
Relief

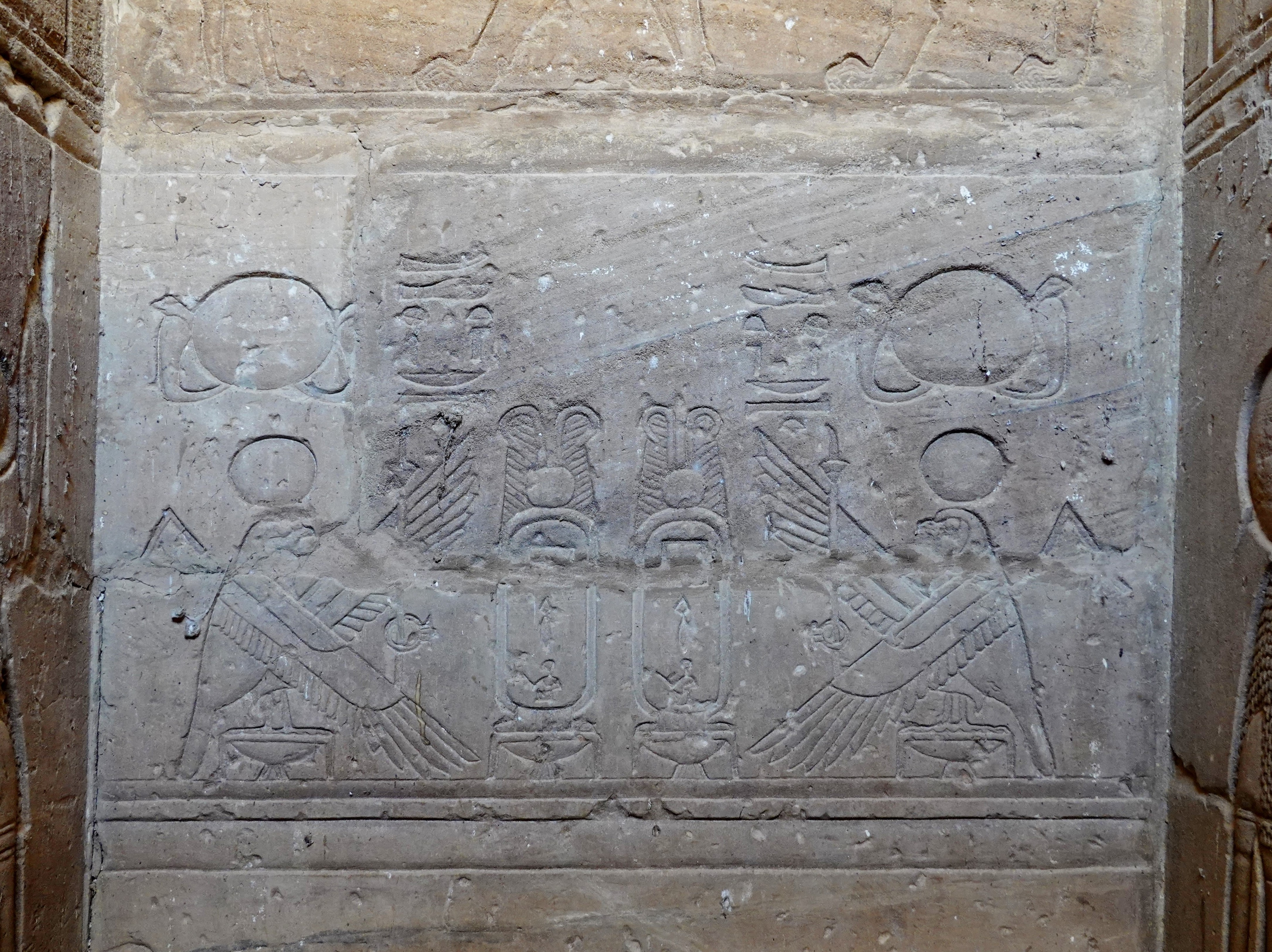
Relief

== See also ==
- List of ancient Egyptian sites, including sites of temples
