= Malewiebamani =

Kushite King of Meroë

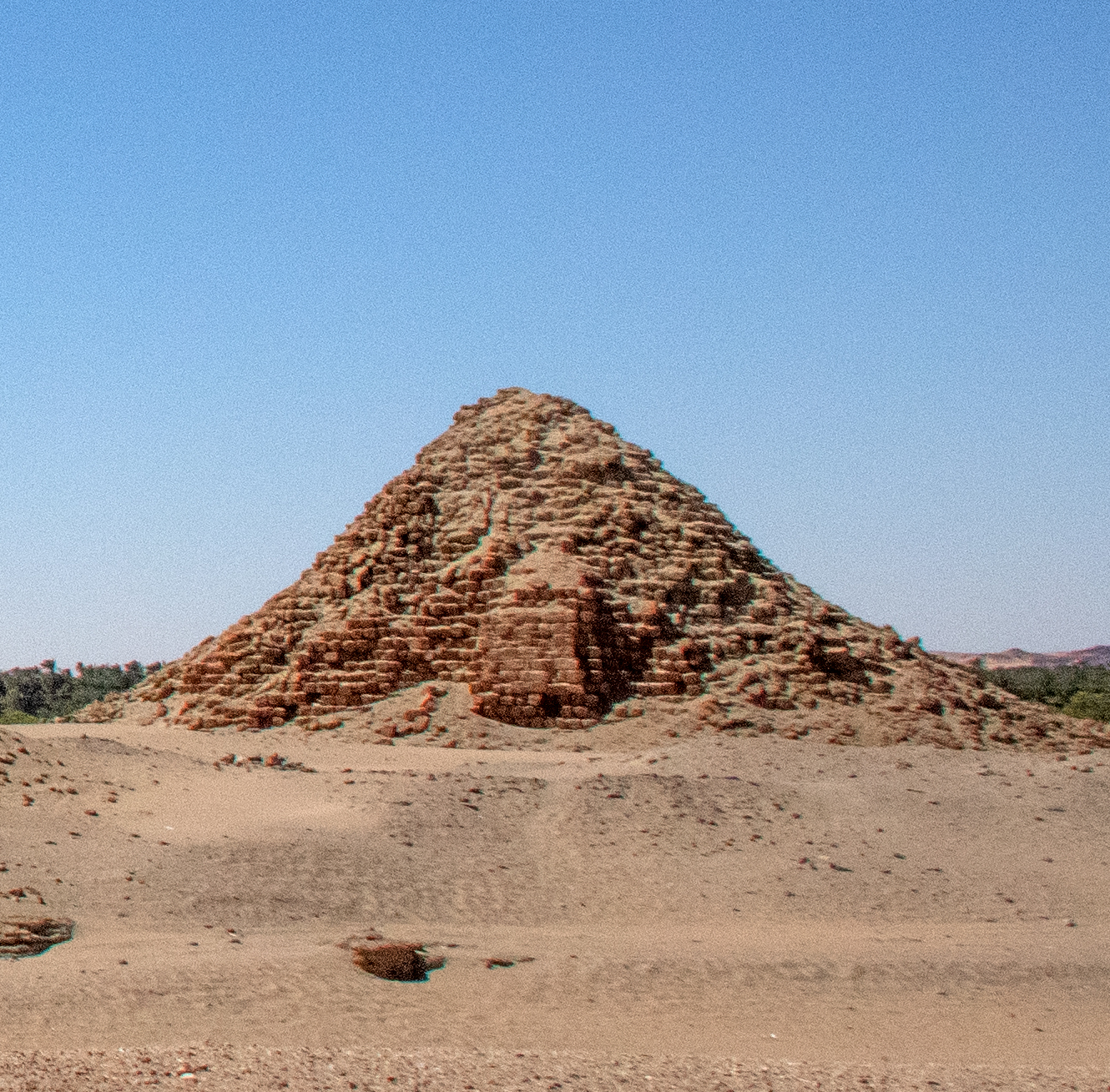
- Pyramid Nuri 11 of Malewiebamani

Kushite King of Meroë
- Reign: 5th century BC
- Predecessor: Nasakhma
- Successor: Talakhamani
Royal titulary
Prenomen
Kheperkare ("Re is one whose ka is manifest")
Nomen
Malewiebamani

G39 N5	i mn n U1 E23 V4 i i D54 b
- Children: Talakhamani?, Amanineteyerike and Baskakeren
- Father: Either Nasakhma or Siaspiqa
- Mother: Probably Queen Saka'aye
- Died: c. 435 BCE
- Burial: Nuri (Nuri 11)

Malewiebamani was a Kushite King of Meroë.

Malewiebamani's mother was likely Queen Saka'aye. Malewiebamani was the son of either Nasakhma or Siaspiqa.

Amanineteyerike and Baskakeren are thought to be sons of Malewiebamani.

Malewiebamani succeeded Nasakhma and in turn was succeeded by Talakhamani, who could be either a son or a younger brother of Malewiebamani.

A Royal wife named Akhrasan from the time of Malewiebamani was buried at Nuri. Her relation to the king is not known.

Malewiebamani's name is known from a Shawabti and from intrusive items from pyramid Nuri 16 bearing his name. On the dedication stela of Aspelta, a private name occurs which is very similar to Malewiebamani's name. His nomen appears at Kawa.
