= Atasamale =

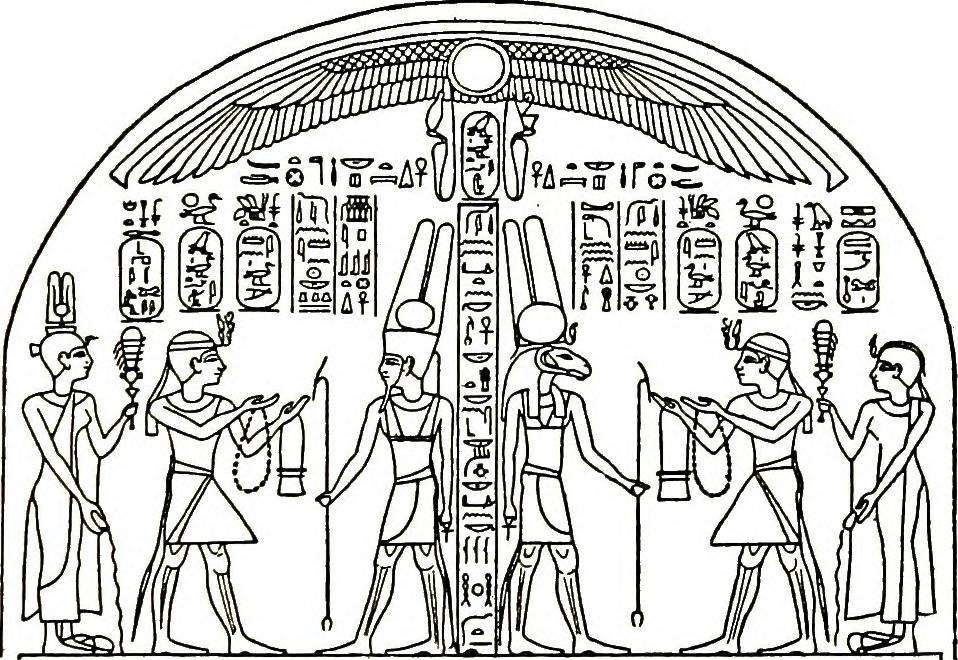
Atasamale on the stela of king Harsiotef. She is depicted on the very right.

Atasamale (also Tesmalo) was the mother of the Nubian king Harsiotef (ruled very roughly around 400 BC). She is known from a stela of her son and from her burial at Nuri. Her titles are mother of the kings, sister of the king and Lady of Kush. She might have been the wife of Amanineteyerike, although this is only a guess.

Her burial at Nuri consisted of a pyramid with a chapel and two underground burial chambers. There was a staircase going underground and leading to two rooms. The burial was found robbed, but fragments of uninscribed shabtis were found. There were several vessels and a die made of faience or white paste. Her name was preserved on an offering table found there
