= Siaspiqa =

King of Kush

- Siaspiqo, Siaspi-qo, Si'aspiqo, Sa'asheriqa.
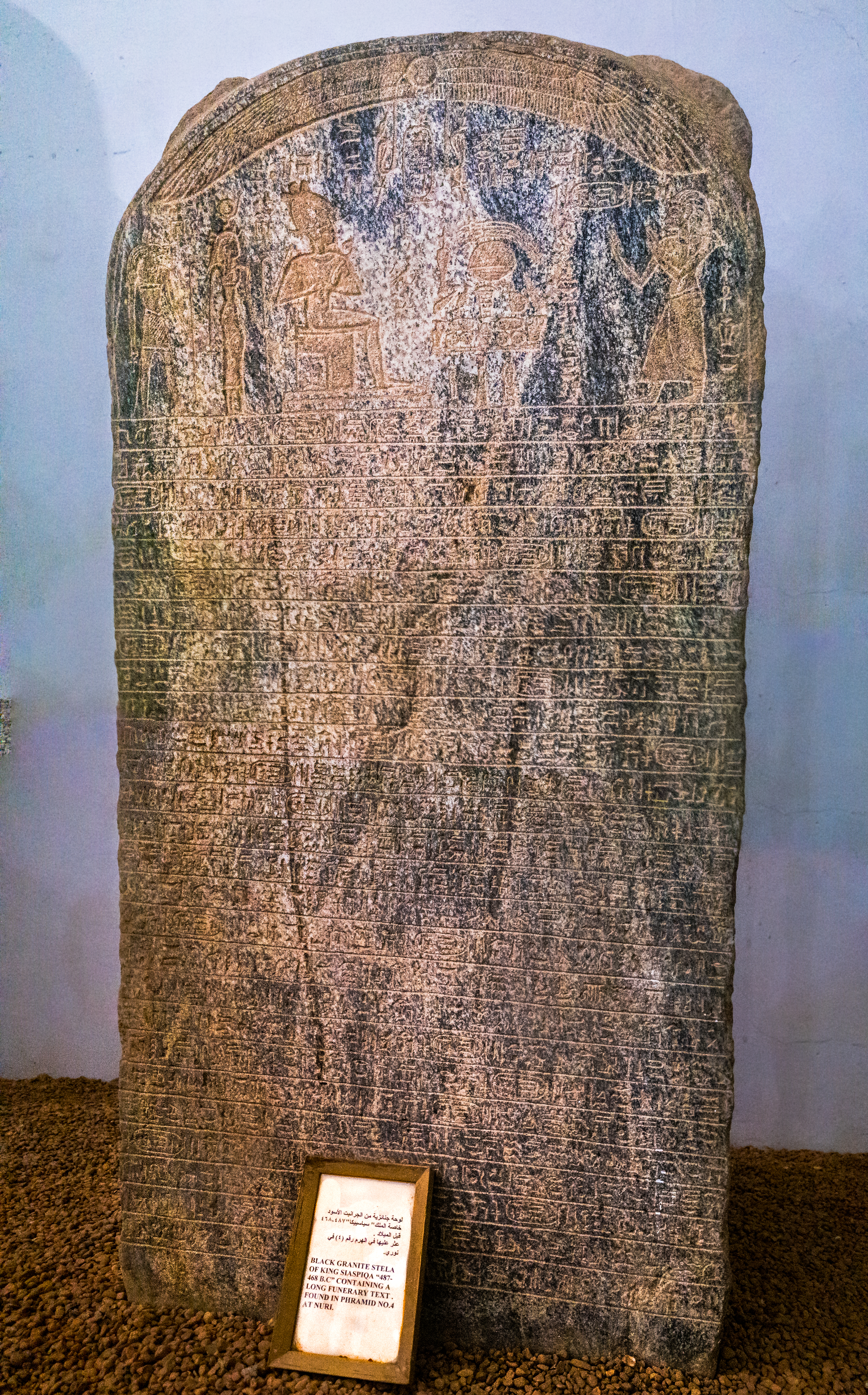
- Granite stela of Siaspiqa originally from his pyramid at Nuri, now on display in the National Museum of Sudan

Kushite king of Meroë
- Reign: c. 487–468 BC
- Predecessor: Amaniastabarqa
- Successor: Nasakhma
Royal titulary
Prenomen
< N5 s W11 r V28 D41 N17 N17 >
sgrḥ-t3wj
Segerehtawyre
"Ra is the pacifier of the Two Lands"
Alternative throne name, contested:
< O34 Y5 n R8 N26 >
smn-ẖrt-nṯr
Semenkheretnetjer
Nomen
< z i A17 O29 z N1 i q >
sjˁ-spj-qo
Siaspiqo
- Consort: possibly queen Pi'ankhqewqa
- Born: 5th century BC
- Died: 468 BC
- Burial: Nuri, pyramid 4

Siaspiqa (also Si'aspiqo) was a ruler of the Kushite kingdom of Meroë reigning for close to twenty years in the first half of the 5th century BC. Very little is known of Siaspiqa's activities beyond the construction of his pyramid at Nuri, now known as Nuri 4. The pyramid and its chapel have yielded several inscribed stelas bearing his name as well as numerous artefacts suggesting a once rich burial. Nothing is known for certain on the relations between Siaspiqa and his predecessor Amaniastabarqa and successor Nasakhma. Equally uncertain is the identity of his consort, with queen Pi'ankhqewqa buried in the nearby Nuri 29 conjectured for that role.

== Identity and chronology ==
Siaspiqa is known under two or less likely three names: his nomen Siaspiqa and one or two throne names Segerehtawyre, which means "Ra is the pacifier of the Two Lands", and possibly Semenkheretnetjer. This last name is contested as it could instead be the name of a ritual connected with erecting the pyramid, plausibly translated as "Cleansing the necropolis". The name Segerehtawyre could reflect an official program of conquest and unification of Egypt by the kingdom of Kush or less aggressive negotiations with the northern neighbour in order to achieve political unity. Alternatively, it is equally possible that the "Two lands" reference here refer to the land controlled by Siaspiqa, that is Kush rather than Upper and Lower Egypt as traditionally implied. Ultimately, the name Segerehtawyre may be based on the Horus name Sehertawy borne by the 7th century BC Kushite king Senkamanisken, this time with the explicit intend of pacifying Egypt under Senkamanisken's rule.

Siaspiqa's filiation is unknown. He is believed to be the successor of Amaniastabarqa—who might have reigned over the period 510–487 BC—based on the relative position of their pyramids with respect to one another. The same argument suggests that Siaspiqa was succeeded by king Nasakhma. Several dates for Siaspiqa's reign have been proposed: 489–471 BC, 487–468 BC, and 478–458 BC, making him a likely contemporary of the Achaemenid emperor Xerxes I, then ruler of Egypt.

== Royal family ==
No member of Siaspiqa's family has been identified with certainty. The archaeologists Dows Dunham and Laming Macadam conjectured that queen Piankhqewqa, buried in pyramid Nuri 29, may have been his consort.

== Attestations ==
Siaspiqa is well attested by numerous finds, the majority of which come from Nuri. These include a libation jar uncovered in the chapel of his pyramid which bears his throne name and nomen, a heart-scarab and a large granite stela inscribed with a funerary text and bearing only his nomen preceded by the traditional Sa Ra epithet. The stela, the top of which was originally coated with golf leaf, depicts Osiris enthroned with Isis and Anubis while Siaspiqa's is shown adoring the god. Another granite offering table likely originating from the chapel of Nuri 4, was discovered in the Coptic church Nuri 100, where it was used as construction material. The church doorway and stair housed two further granite offering stands with the cartouches of the king. These objects are now in the National Museum of Sudan, Khartoum.

His tomb, the 4th pyramid of Nuri, was excavated in 1917 under the aegis of a joint Harvard University-Boston Museum of Fine Arts Expedition. These works have yielded at least 11 fragmentary faience shawabtis found in debris left by thieves, the upper half of one of which is currently housed in the Boston Museum of Fine Arts. The same excavations also produced a beryl cylinder, a small gold pendant shaped like the bird representing a Ba soul as well as golden beaded discs, pieces of gold foil, a gold rosette and two uninscribed gold finger rings, all of which might have belonged to Siaspiqa. A separate excavation undertaken in 1922 unearthed a gold plaque part of a foundation deposit in the king's pyramid at Nuri, it is now in the British Museum. Pieces of amazonite and slate and travertine inlays from Siaspiqa's sarcophagus have also been uncovered together with a small offering vessel and cup, both made of clay. A piece of the rim of an alabaster canopic jar has also been found, which could be significant as the last known royal use of such equipment although the jar could instead be an intrusion, hence not dating from Siaspiqa's reign.

Siaspiqa's name is also attested on votive objects from the temple of Amun in Meroë.

== Pyramid ==
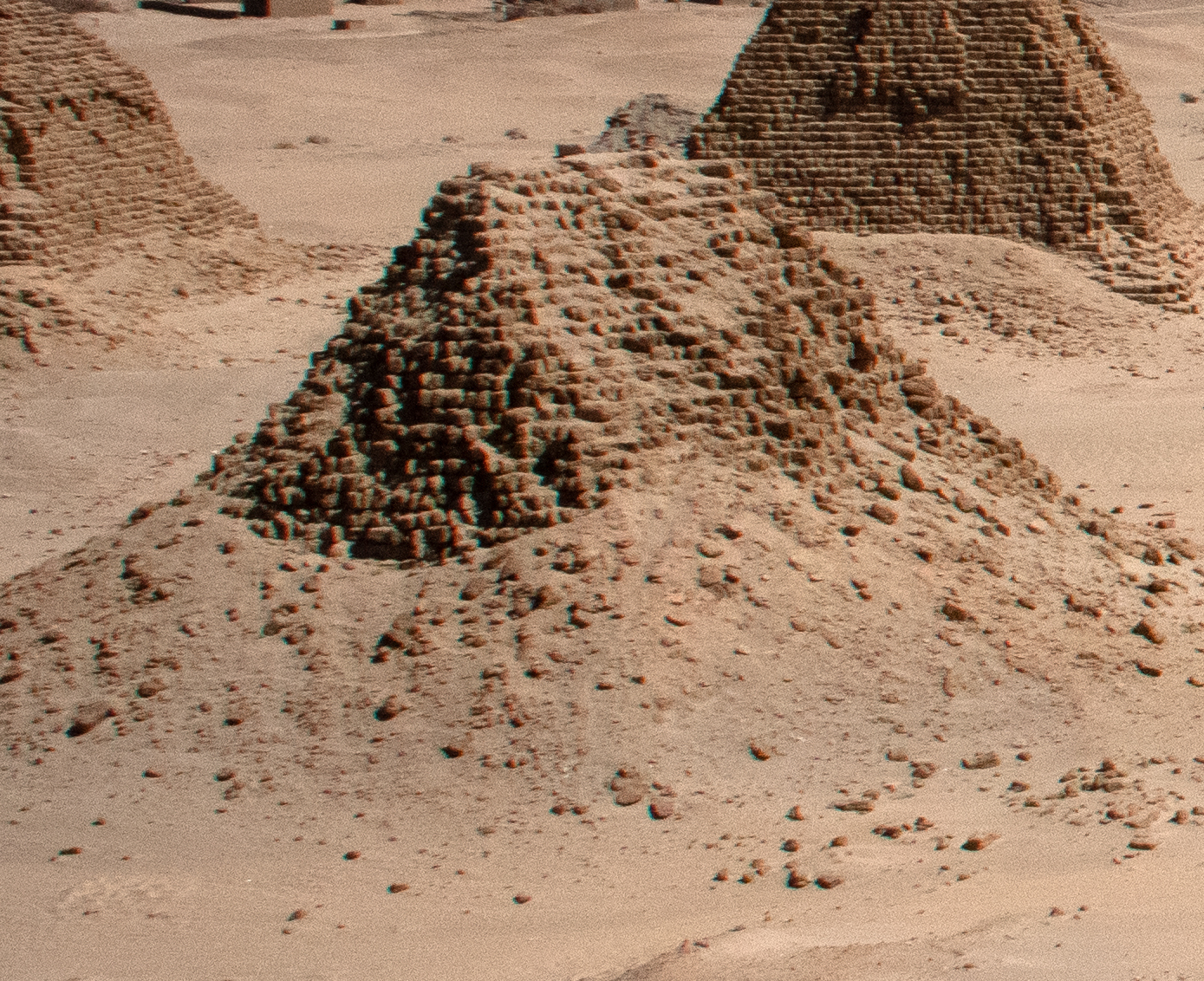
Pyramid Nuri 4 of Siaspiqa.

Siaspiqa was buried in a pyramid he had prepared for himself at the royal necropolis of Nuri, now known as pyramid Nuri 4. The pyramid is made of sandstone masonry disposed in a plinth course as well as a sandstone enclosure. The building, too damaged to evaluate its original height, covers an approximately square surface of 26.95 meters per side.

Adjacent to the south-eastern face of the pyramid is a small chapel which housed the main granite offering stela. Walls of chapel might have been plastered white with incised hieroglyphs in red and gold.

The pyramid was built atop three subterranean chambers on the same level and entered in succession from a long corridor accessed via a flight of 49 stairs starting at ground level, the entrance of which is nearly 40 m (130 ft) in front of the chapel. The corridor is still blocked by a masonry plug as the thieves entered the pyramid by digging a vertical hole from ground level and leading directly behind the plug. The first chamber is 4.9 m × 4 m (16 ft × 13 ft) in size with a paved floor, the second is 5.8 m × 5.9 m (19 ft × 19 ft), its floor unpaved, and the third and largest is 7.50 m × 6.65 m (24.6 ft × 21.8 ft) with a paved floor of sandstone and granite. The walls of the chamber are uninscribed.

The burial chamber originally housed one or possibly two wooden anthropoid coffins for the king that were richly inlaid with obsidian, Lapis lazuli, slate and alabaster materials. Four fragments of what might be a human skull have also been uncovered there.
