= Amaninatakilebte =

Nubian king

- Amaninatakilebte
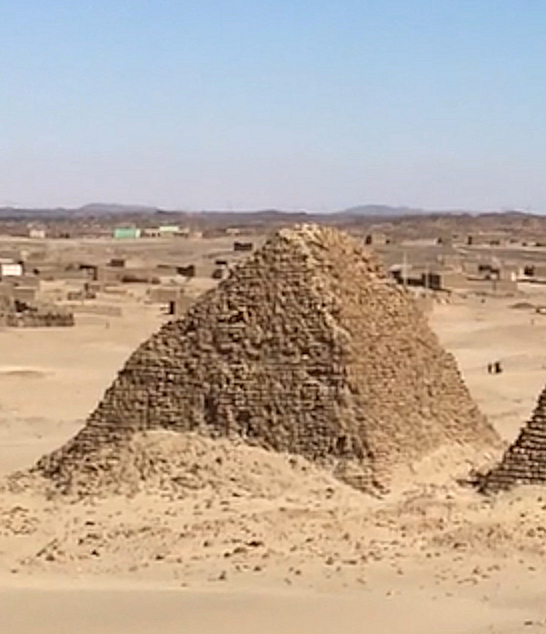
- Nuri pyramid X of King Amaninatakilebte

Kushite King of Meroë
- Reign: c. 538–519 BC
- Predecessor: Analmaye
- Successor: Karkamani
Royal titulary
Nomen
Amaninatakilebte

G39 N5	i mn n n N17 kA rw b ti
- Burial: Nuri (Nu. 10)

Amaninatakilebte was a Meroitic king who ruled in the 6th century, probably between 538 and 519 BC at Napata. He succeeded King Analmaye and was in turn succeeded by King Karkamani. Like others of his dynasty, he was discovered buried among the pyramid chambers at Nuri, specifically Nuri 10. These remains, along with engraved blocks at Meroe, are the only known records of the ruler. Also significant is the gold cylinder discovered with the ruler in this pyramid, not unlike those found buried with King Aspelta in Nuri 8, but the function of which remains obscure.

According to Herodotus, the Persian King, Cambyses attempted an invasion of Meroe in about 525 BC during the reign of Amaninatakilebte but stopped after a few failed campaigns.

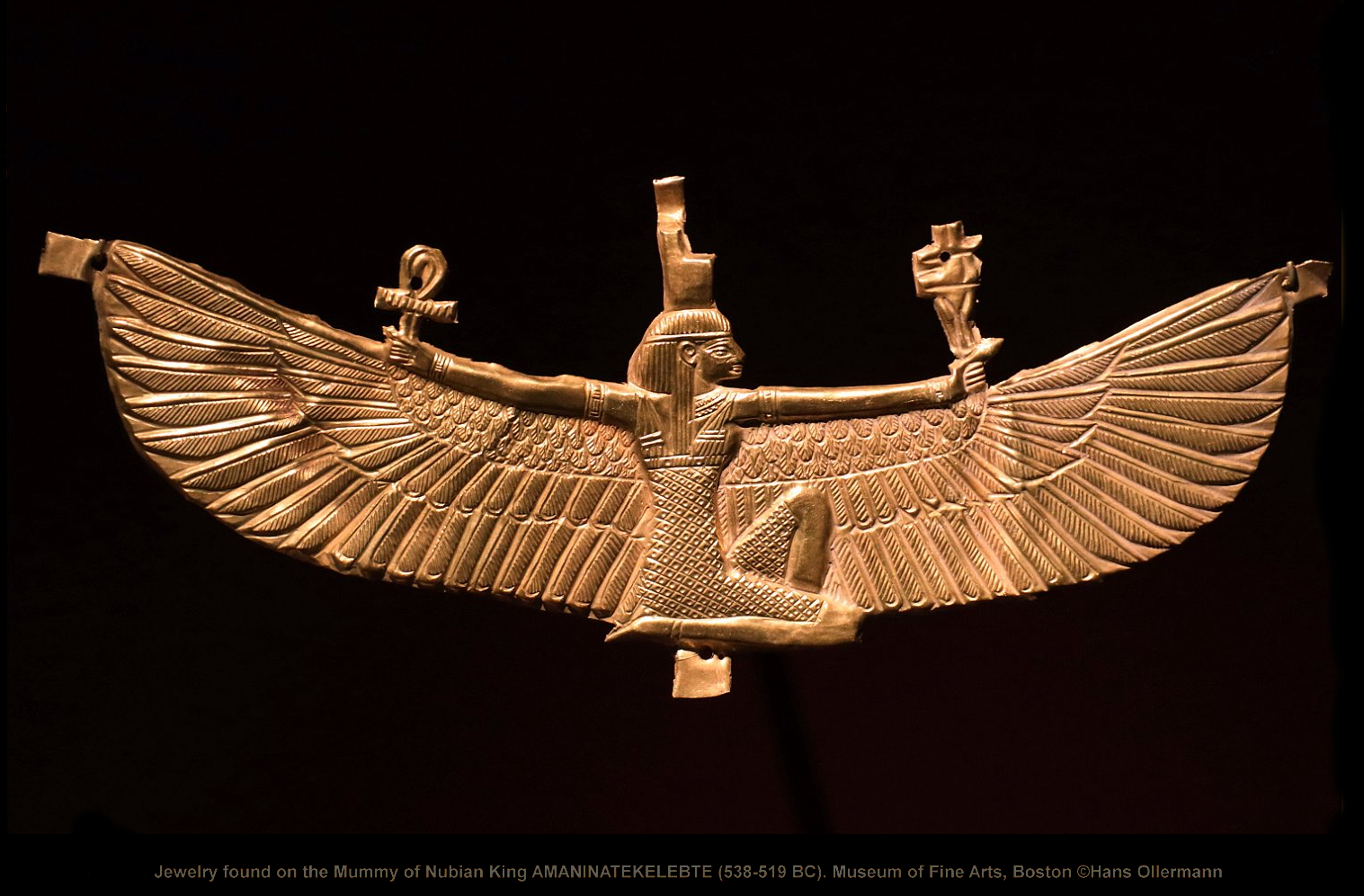
Jewelry found on the Mummy of Nubian King Amaninatakilebte (538-519 BCE), Nuri pyramid 10. Museum of Fine Arts, Boston.

Preceded by Analmaye	Rulers of Kush	Succeeded by Karkamani
