= Nasakhma =

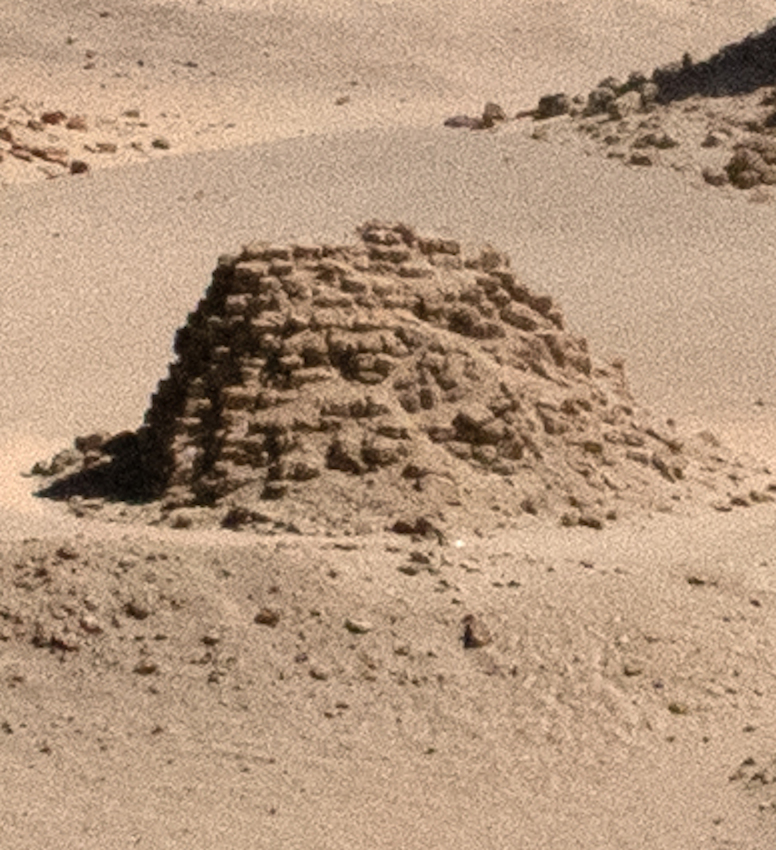
- Pyramid Nuri XIX of King Nasakhma, successor of king Siaspiqa

Kushite King of Meroë
- Reign: 5th century BC
- Predecessor: Siaspiqa
- Successor: Malewiebamani
Royal titulary
Nomen
Nasakhma

G39 N5	M23 M23 Aa18 Aa1 Z1 U1 D1
- Consort: Queen Saka'aye
- Children: Malewiebamani and possibly Talakhamani
- Burial: Nuri 19

Nasakhma (Nasakhmaqa) was a Kushite King of Meroë. He was the successor of king Siaspiqa.

Nasakhma was succeeded by Malewiebamani, who may have been his eldest son. It is possible that Talakhamani was a younger son of Nasakhma who took the throne after his brother Malewiebamani. Another possibility is that Talakhamani is Malewiebamani's son and thus possibly Nasakhma's grandson.

Nasakhma was buried at Nuri (Nu. 19). The Boston Museum of Fine Arts holds several objects that may belong to Nasakhma: shabtis, vessel fragments, etc. excavated from his tomb.

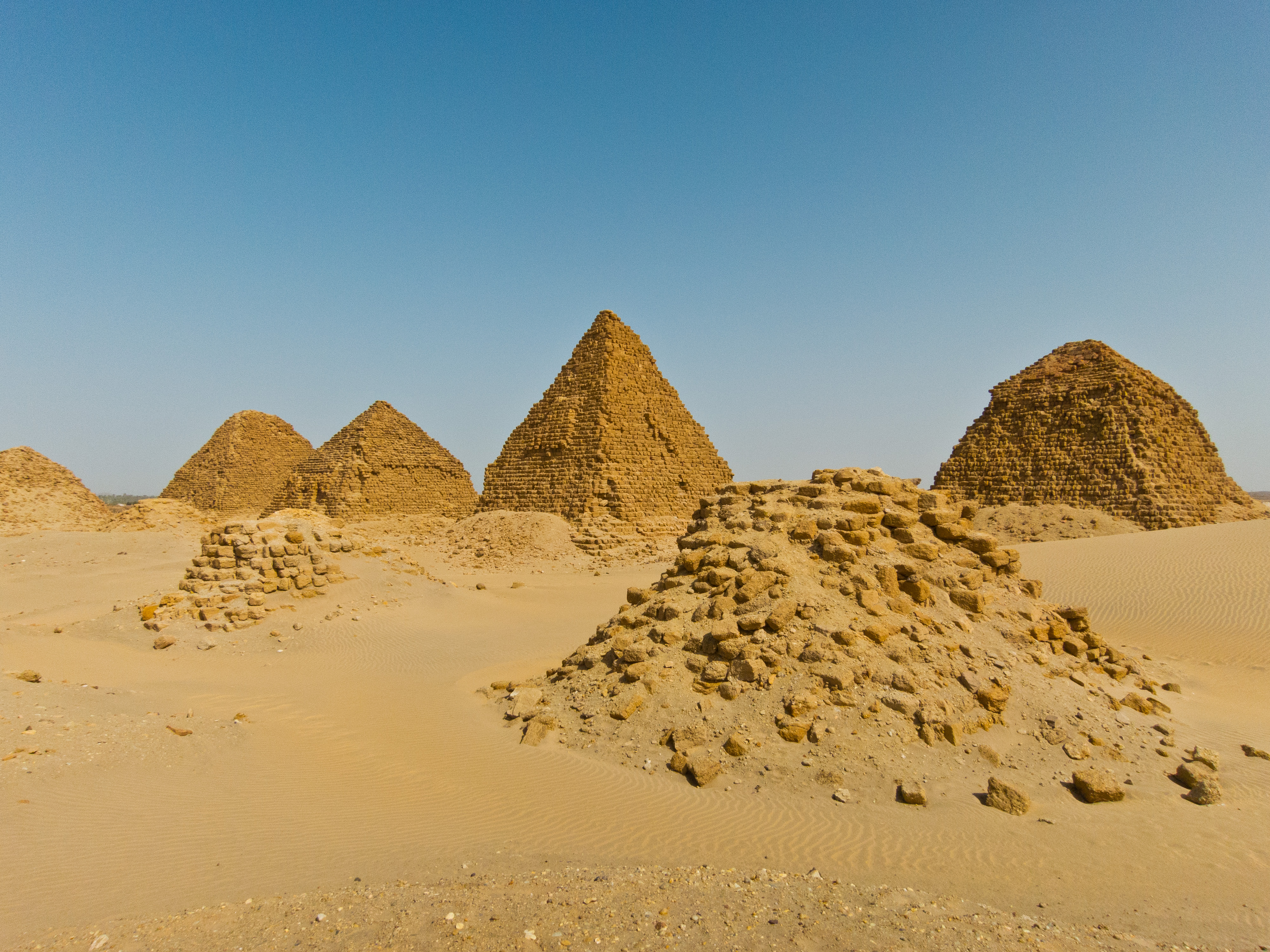
Pyramids at the royal cemetery of Nuri. The small ruins in the front are Nuri 18 (Analmaye), and Nuri 19 (Nasakhma)
