= Atakhebasken =

Ancient Nubian queen

< i A2 Aa1 t G29 S24 V31 n Z4 >
Atakhebasken
in hieroglyphs
Era: 3rd Intermediate Period
(1069–664 BC)

Atakhebasken (Akhetbasaken) was a Nubian queen dated to the Twenty-fifth Dynasty of Egypt. She was the Great Royal Wife of Pharaoh Taharqa.

== Burial ==
Atakhebasken is mainly known from her tomb in Nuri (Nu. 36). The finds from the tomb include: a shawabti, canopic jars, which are now in Boston, and an altar now in the Meroe Museum in Khartoum. Her tomb was enlarged after the chapel had already been built.
