= Baskakeren =

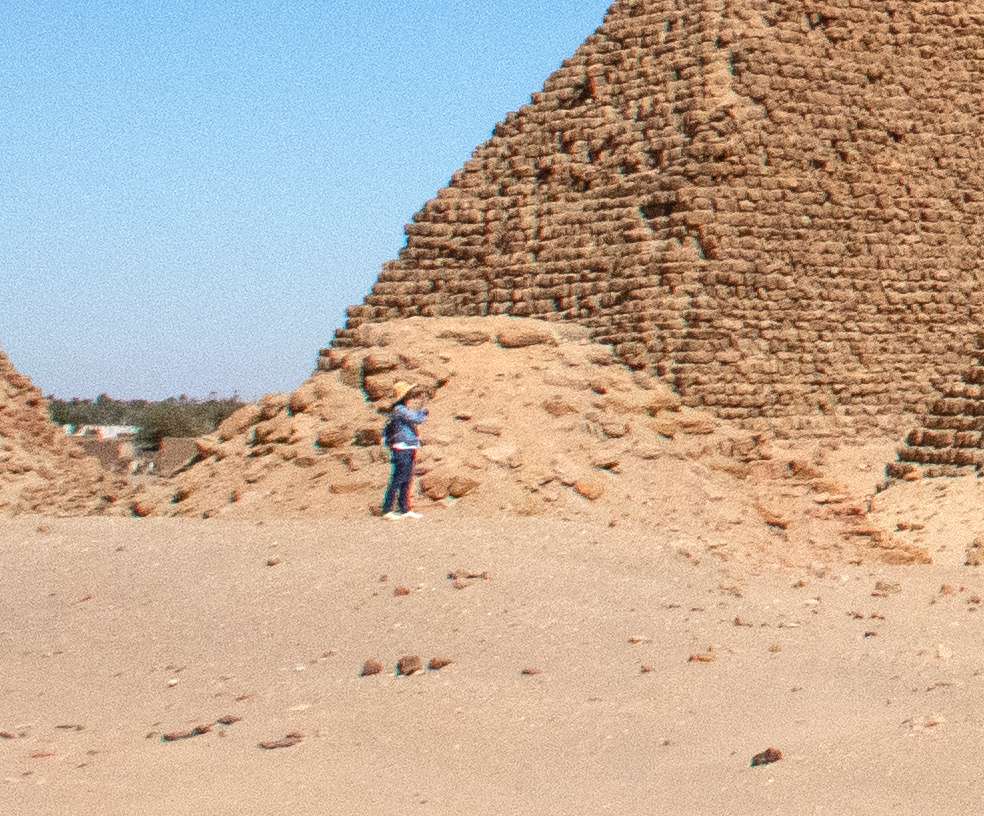
- Nuri pyramid Nu XVII of King Baskakeren (ruins in the center)

Kushite King of Meroë
- Reign: end of the 5th century BC
- Predecessor: Amanineteyerike
- Successor: Harsiotef
Royal titulary
Nomen
Baskakeren

G39 N5	E10 z D28 Z1 D21 nb M22 M22
- Father: Malewiebamani
- Burial: Nuri (Nu. 17)

Baskakeren was a king of Kush (about 400 BC). He was likely a son of King Malewiebamani and the younger brother of King Amanineteyerike. He succeeded King Amanineteyerike to the throne.

Baskakeren is so far only known from his small pyramid in Nuri (Nu.17). The size of his pyramid indicates that he reigned for only a short period of time. Known from a stela from his chapel in Meroe Museum (in Khartoum).
