= Malonaqen =

Malonaken Sekhemkare
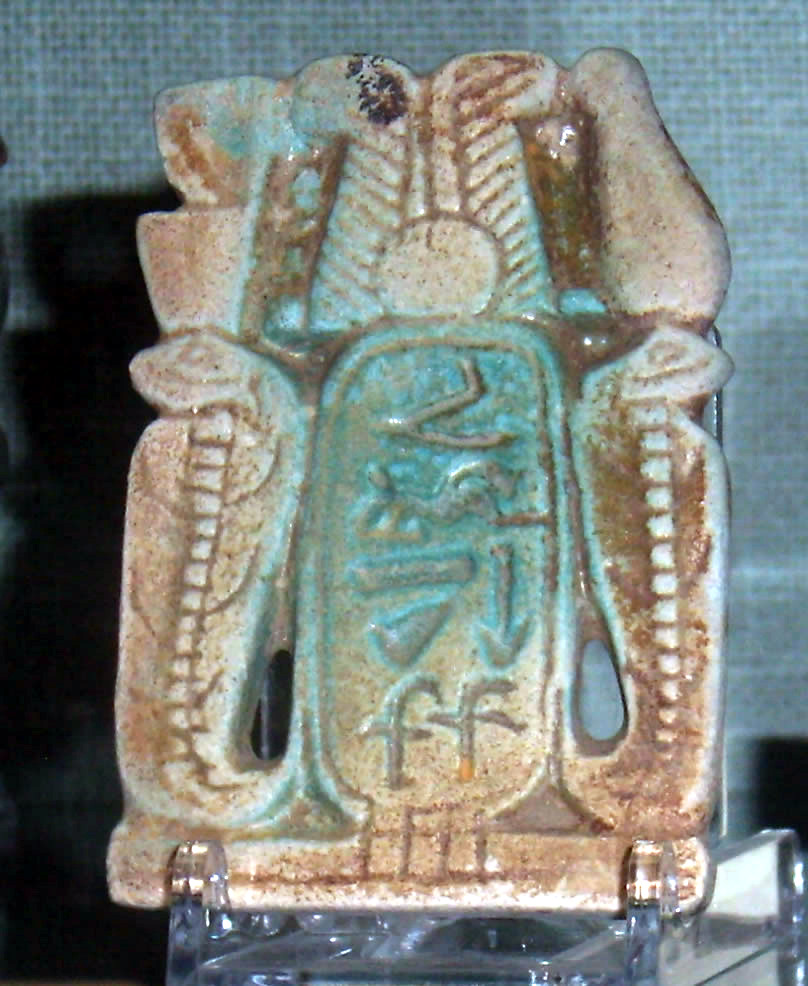
- Votive cartouche of Malonaqen (Ashmolean Museum)

Kushite King of Meroë
- Reign: first half of the 6th century BC
- Predecessor: Aramatle-qo
- Successor: Analmaye
Royal titulary
Prenomen
Sekhemkare

M23 X1 L2 X1	N5 S42 D28
Nomen
Malonaqen

G39 N5	U1 E23 nfr n N29 M23 M23
- Consort: Queen Tagtal
- Father: Aramatle-qo
- Mother: Queen Amanitakaye
- Burial: Nuri 5

Malonaqen was a Meroitic king who probably Ruled in the first half of the 6th century BC. His prenomen was "Sekhemkare".

He is thought to be the son of king Aramatle-qo and queen Amanitakaye, although this is based merely on assumptions. His queen consort is thought to be Tagtal, who was buried at Nuri (Nu. 45).

== Attestations ==
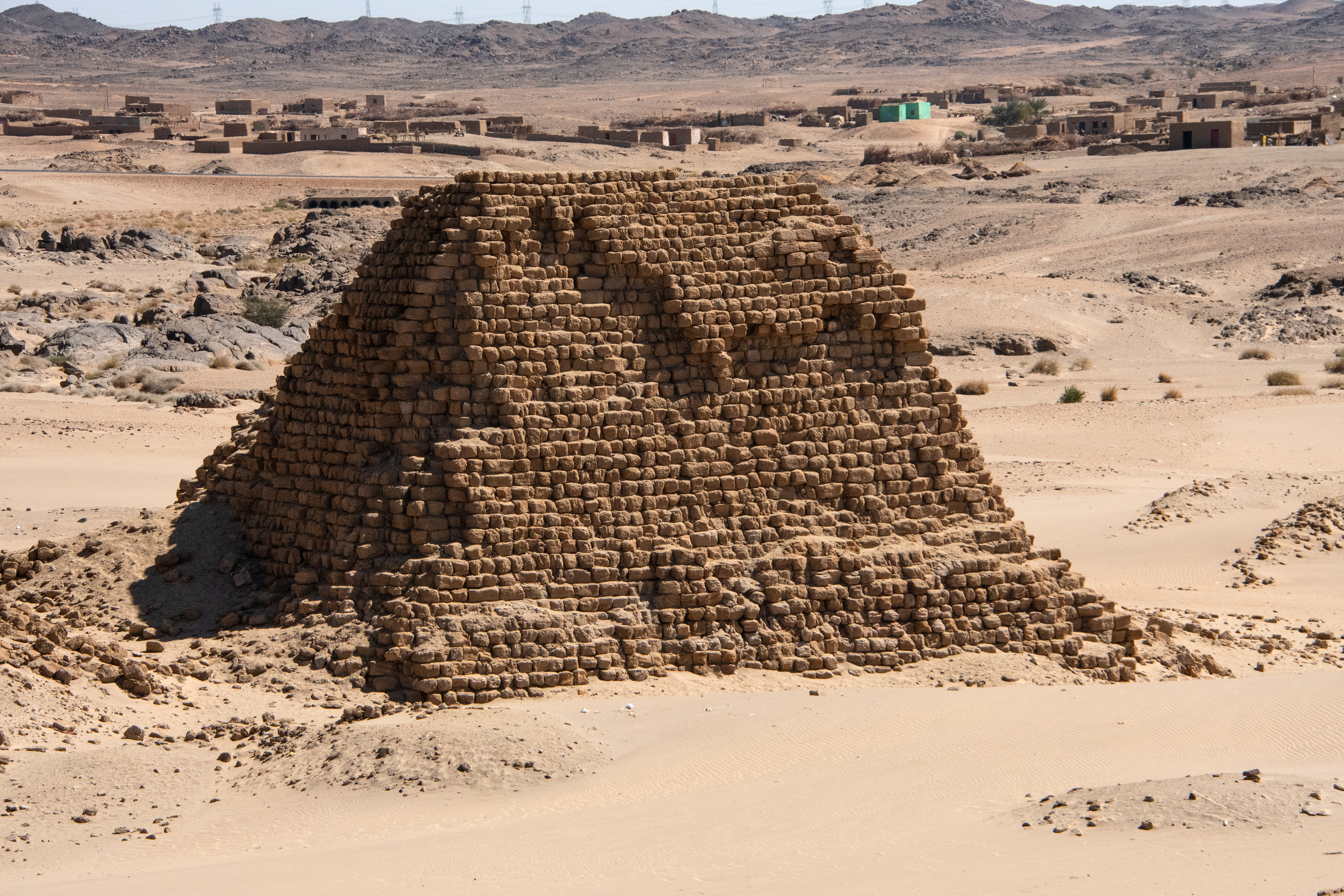
Nuri Pyramid V of King Malenaqen r. c. 553-538 BCE

He is well known from his pyramid (Nu.5) at Nuri as well as by a votive cartouche from Kawa and on blocks (from temple M 242, 294) and other objects in Meroë. His pyramid at Nuri consists of the pyramid proper with a base length of 27.8 m. In front of the pyramid there was once a small chapel. The three underground burial chambers were reached by a staircase. The chambers were found looted, but still contained a number of objects, including the shabtis of the king and stone vessels inscribed with his name.

Preceded by Aramatle-qo	Rulers of Kush	Succeeded by Analmaye
