= Analmaye =

Kushite King of Meroë who ruled in the 6th century BC

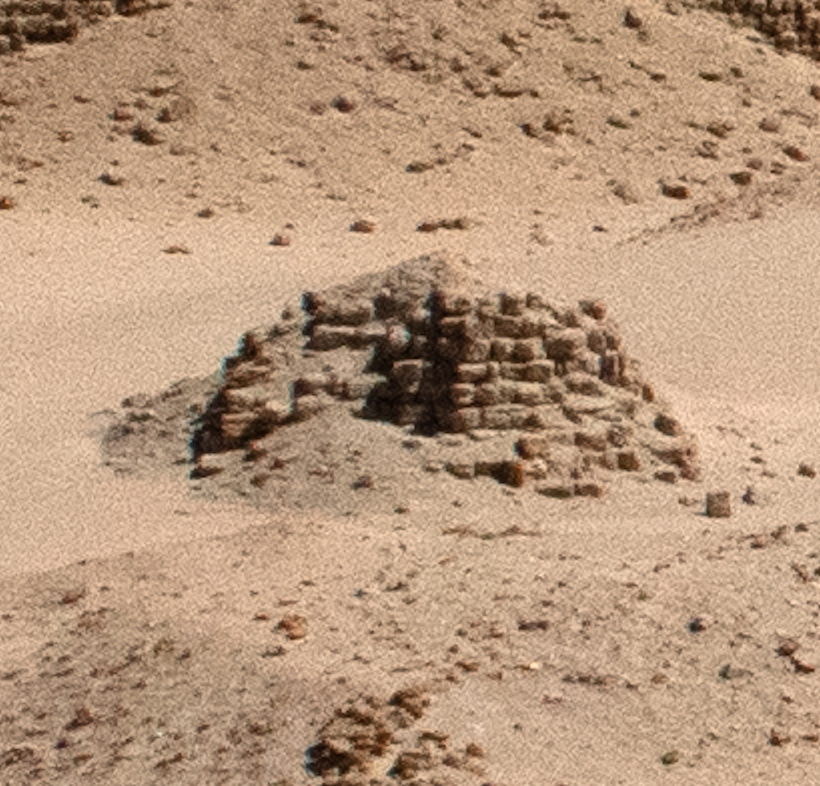
- Pyramid Nuri XVIII of King Analmaye

Kushite King of Meroë
- Reign: mid-6th century BC
- Predecessor: Malonaqen
- Successor: Amaninatakilebte
Royal titulary
Nomen
Analmaye

| G39 N5 | i n rw mA aA |
- Burial: Nuri (Nuri 18)

Analmaye was a Kushite King of Meroë who ruled in the 6th century BC.

He succeeded King Malonaqen and was in turn succeeded by King Amaninatakilebte.

He was buried in Nuri.

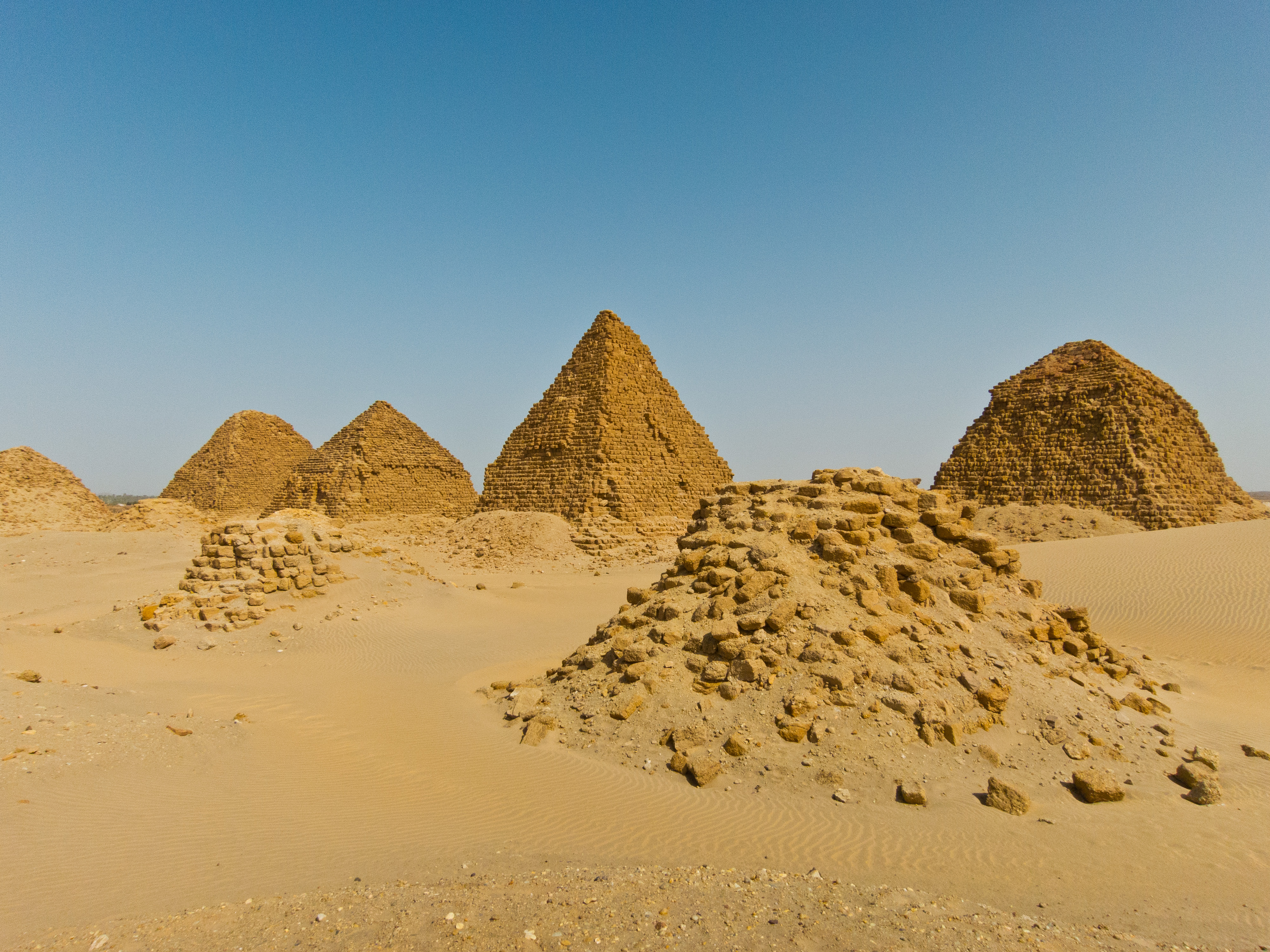
Pyramids at the royal cemetery of Nuri. The small ruins in the front are Nuri 18 (Analmaye), and Nuri 19 (Nasakhma)

| Preceded by Malonaqen | Rulers of Kush | Succeeded by Amaninatakilebte |
