= Talakhamani =

Kushite King of Meroë

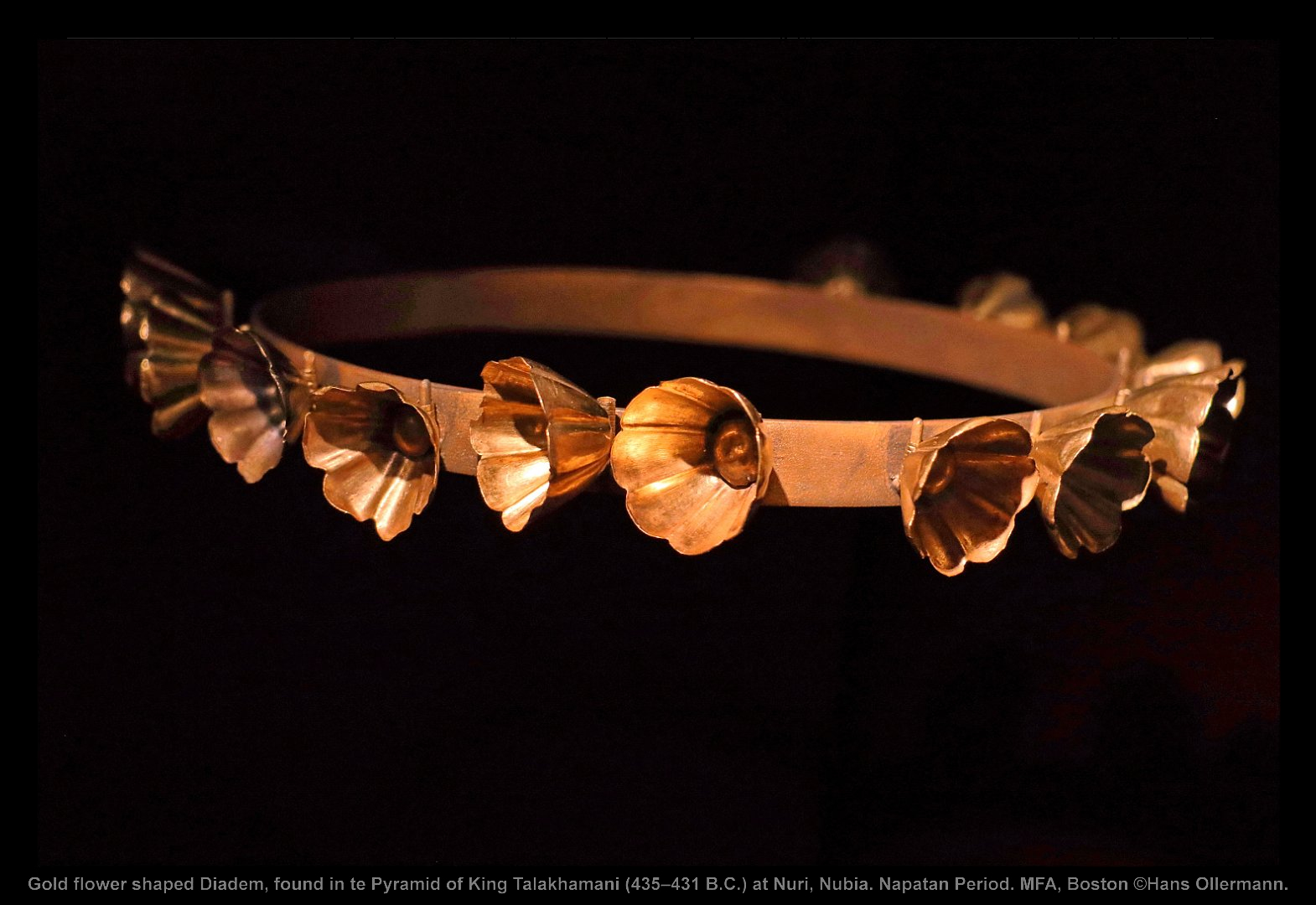
- Gold flower shaped Diadem, found in the Pyramid of King Talakhamani (435–431 BCE), Nuri pyramid 16. Museum of Fine Arts, Boston.

Kushite King of Meroë
- Reign: second half of the 5th century BCE
- Predecessor: Malewiebamani
- Successor: Amanineteyerike
Royal titulary
Nomen
Talakhamani

G39 N5	i mn n tA rw x
- Burial: Nuri (Nuri 16)

Talakhamani was a Kushite King of Meroë during the second half of the 5th century BCE. No prenomen is known, and his nomen is Talakhamani. He may have been a son of Nasakhma and a younger brother of Malewiebamani. Alternatively, Talakhamani may have been a son of Malewiebamani.

Talakhamani is known from a stela from his chapel which is now in Boston. According to an inscription in Kawa he died in his palace at Meroe. He is said to have been succeeded by Amanineteyerike at the age of 41.

Talakhamani's name is etymologically identical with that of King Talakhidamani, who ruled seven centuries later in the late 3rd or early 4th century AD.

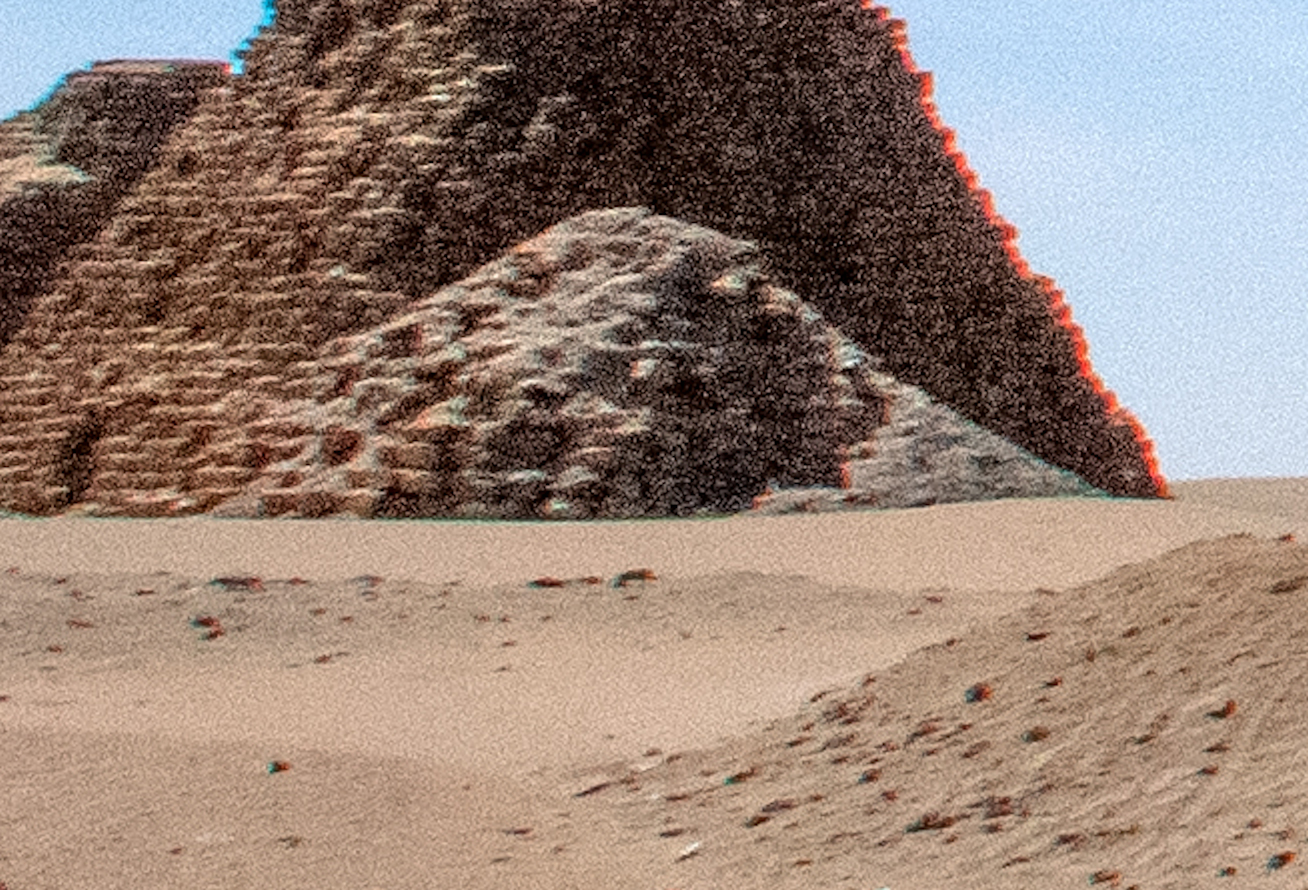
Nuri pyramid XVI of King Talakhamani (ruins in the forefront)
