= Amanitakaye =

Nubian royal woman

Amanitakaye (c. 6th century BCE) was a Nubian royal woman, likely a queen, who was part of the royal family of the kingdom of Kush. She is only known from her burial in the royal cemetery of Nuri (Nuri 26), located in modern-say Sudan. She was perhaps the mother of king Malonaqen, but this is only a guess, although supported by objects with that king's name in her burial. It has been suggested that she may have the daughter of Aspelta and sister-wife of Aramatle-qo.

She bears the titles king's mother and king's sister.

Amanitakaye's burial consisted of a pyramid with a chapel and underground burial rooms. In the chapel there was still standing a stela. There was a staircase going underground and leading to the two burial chambers. The burial was found robbed, but fragments of at least 89 shabtis were found. They bear the name and the title of the queen. Several vessels were also found, as well as faience plaques with her name and with the name of king Malonaqen. This might indicate that she was his mother. Another object, an electrum cylinder, also bore her name, as well as giving her the title king's sister.
