= Akhrasan =

Nubian queen

< Sw A40 x r z n >
Akhrasan
i-ḫ-rsn
in hieroglyphs
Era: Kingdom of Kush
(780 BC–350 AD)

Akhrasan was a Nubian queen, so far only known from her burial in the royal cemetery of Nuri (Nu. 32). She was perhaps the wife of king Malewiebamani, although this is not securely confirmed. Her only known title is king's wife. Her burial consisted of a pyramid and underground burial rooms, with a staircase leading to two underground burial chambers. The burial was found robbed, but fragments of at least 45 shabtis were found. They bear the name and the title of the queen. Several pottery vessels and smaller objects were found, as well.
