= Tagtal =

Nubian queen

Tagtal was a Nubian queen with the titles king's wife and Egyptian. Her husband is not known for sure. Malonaqen had been proposed although this is only a guess. So far she is only known from her burial at Nuri (Nu. 45). Tagtal is also known from her burial at Nuri. The latter consisted of a pyramid with a chapel and one underground burial chamber. The pyramid and chapel were found totally destroyed. There was a staircase going underground and leading to the burial that was found heavily looted. Fragments of 15 shabtis preserved her name that was difficult to read due to their bad preservation. There appears also her titles, king's wife and a second one, perhaps to be read as Egyptian. The inscriptions there are made in Egyptian hieroglyphs, but the texts are hard to read.
