= Amanineteyerike =

5th-century BCE Kushite King of Meroe

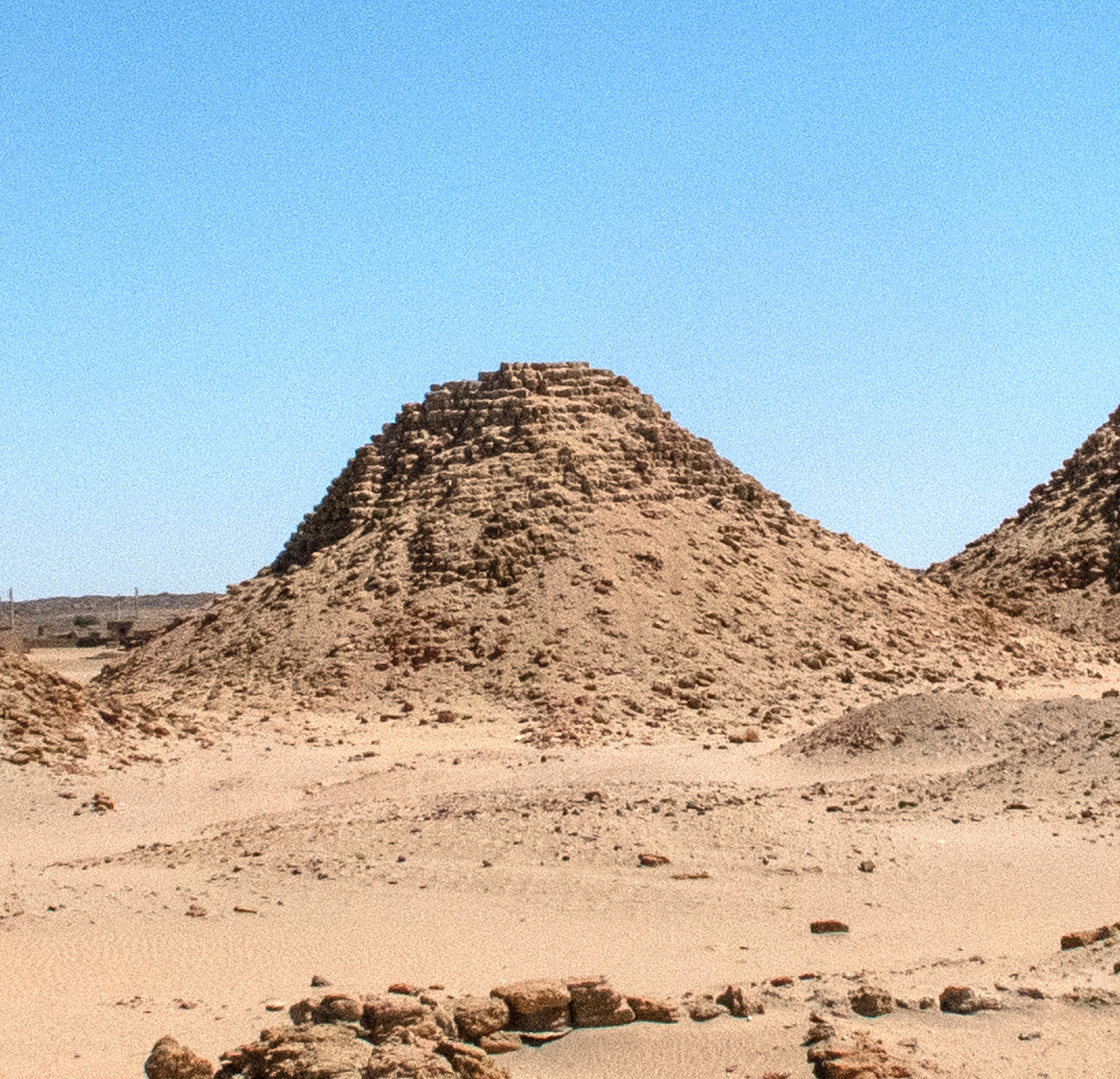
- Nuri pyramid Nu XII of King Amanineteyerike

Kushite King of Meroë
- Reign: 5th century BC
- Predecessor: Talakhamani
- Successor: Baskakeren
Royal titulary
Horus name
Khanakht Khaemwaset ("Mighty Bull appearing in Thebes"); Mortuary name (?) Hortawy
Nebty name
ttawyneb ("Seizer of every land"); Mortuary name (?) Merymaat
Golden Horus
Uafkhesutneb(ut) ("Subduer of every land"); Mortuary name (?) Irymaat
Prenomen
Neferibre ("Re is one whose heart is beautiful")
Nomen
Amanineteyerike ( 'rk-Imn-nwty) ("Begotten of Amun of No(=Thebes)")

G39 N5	i mn n D12 D12 i A2 r V31
- Father: Malewiebamani
- Burial: Pyramid at Nuri (Nuri 12)

Amanineteyerike (Amanneteyerike, Aman-nete-yerike, Irike-Amannote) was a Kushite King of Meroë. His reign is dated to the end of the 5th century BCE.

Amanineteyerike took on a full set of titles based on those of the Egyptian Pharaohs.

Amanineteyerike was the son of King Malewiebamani, and brother of Baskakeren. His predecessor Talakhamani was either an older brother or an uncle. He was buried at the royal cemetery in Nuri (Nuri 12).

The earliest occurrence of the name Meroe so far found was on the stele of Amanineteyerike.
