= Dows Dunham =

American Egyptologist (1890–1984)

- Born: June 1, 1890; Irvington, New York, US
- Died: January 10, 1984 (aged 93); Boston, Massachusetts, US
- Education: Harvard University (AB)
- Parent: Carroll Dunham Jr.
- Scientific career
- Fields: Egyptology
- Institutions: Museum of Fine Arts, Boston

Dows Dunham (1 June 1890 – 10 January 1984) was an American archaeologist, Egyptologist, and curator of Egyptian art at the Museum of Fine Arts in Boston.

== Career ==
Dunham studied art history at Harvard University from 1909 to 1913. He was taught by George Andrew Reisner, who offered him a job and made him one of his main assistants. Dunham was a member of numerous expeditions in Egypt and Sudan beginning in 1914, where he worked mainly on Reisner's team. In Giza, for example, he worked in the grave of Hetepheres I. He also searched the royal graves of the Kingdom of Kush in Sudan.

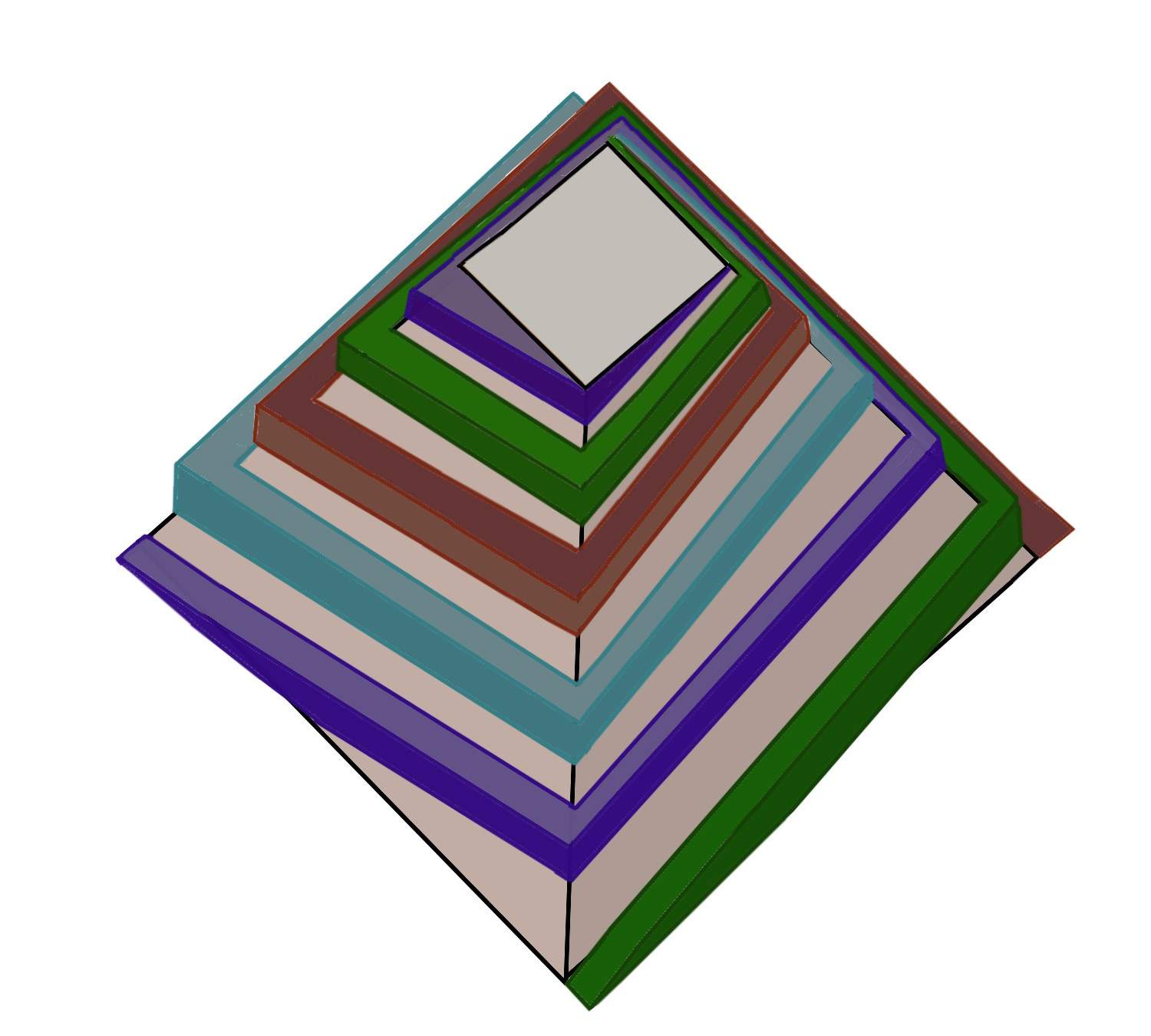
Ramp model by Dows Dunham

He was a curator at the Egyptian department of the Museum of Fine Arts in Boston until 1956, and published a large part of the excavations of George Andrew Reisner, whose excavation documents are kept in the Museum of Fine Arts after his retirement.

In 1956, he published a proposal for building the Great Pyramid with spiral ramps. On each of the four sides of the pyramid, a separate ramp path starts at the left corner. These are positioned on the inner step pyramid and wind upwards in an anti-clockwise direction. Walter Vose of the Massachusetts Institute of Technology advised the project with practical engineering knowledge. Mark Lehner did write in his book: "This form of ramp would require far less material than the straight-on type".

== Honors ==
- In 1954, he was elected to the American Academy of Arts and Sciences.
- He was awarded the Gold Medal Award for Distinguished Archaeological Achievement in 1979.

== Bibliography ==
- Recollections of an Egyptologist (1972)
