= Lists of pyramids =

Comparison of approximate profiles of a few notable pyramidal or near-pyramidal buildings. Dotted lines indicate original heights, where data is available. In its SVG file, hover over a pyramid to highlight and click for its article.

This is a list of lists of pyramids.

- Lepsius list of pyramids
- List of Egyptian pyramids
- List of Mesoamerican pyramids
- List of pyramid mausoleums in North America
- List of pyramids in Ireland
- List of Pyramids of Meroe
- List of tallest pyramids

== See also ==
- List of megalithic sites
- List of the oldest buildings in the world
