= Takideamani =

Kushite king

Kushite King of Meroë
- Reign: First half of the 3rd century CE
- Predecessor: Amanikhedolo
- Successor: Mashadakhel
Royal titulary
- Father: Adeqetali
- Mother: Nptdḫeto
- Burial: Pyramid at Meroë (Beg N. 29)
- Dynasty: Meroitic period

Takideamani was a Nubian king who probably reigned in the second or third century AD.

So far he is only known from the pyramid Beg. N 29 in Meroë. His name is documented there in Meroitic hieroglyphs on an offering table. His parents are also named there. His father's name was Adeqetali and his mother's name was Napatadakheto. The offering table is now in Berlin.
