= Bartare =

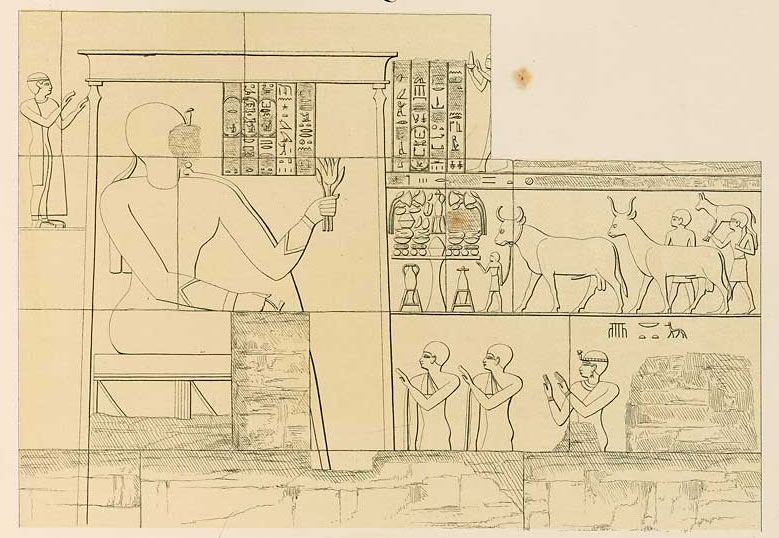
Bartare as shown in her pyramid temple

Bartare was a Nubian queen, so far only known from her burial in the royal cemetery of Meroë (Beg. S 10 ). She was one of the first royal women with the important title kdke (Kandake).

Her burial consists of a pyramid and a small temple in front of it. Under the pyramid is a corridor leading to two burial chambers that were painted. The chambers were found looted but still contained shabtis and some other objects. The pyramid temple is decorated with reliefs showing the queen and providing her name and title. The name Bartare and the title Kandake are written within a Cartouche. She is also called son of Ra and king of Upper and Lower Egypt. Therefore, some scholars regarded her as a king. However, more recent research sees her as a non ruling queen, perhaps dating around 200 BC.
