= List of pyramid mausoleums in North America =

This is a list of pyramid mausoleums in North America. This Egyptian Revival funerary architecture was generally an extravagance of American tycoons who wanted themselves remembered as long and as well as the ancient pharaohs. Many of these date from the 1890s to the 1920s, when older, more modest expressions of "Egyptomania" gave way to "Egyptian temples or pyramids replete with guardian sphinxes, lotus-bedecked urns and columns, and Egyptian- themed stained glass windows."

== Individuals and families ==
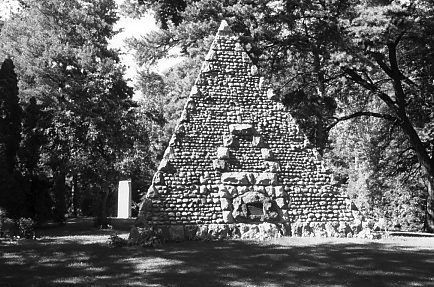
Gunckel Monument, Toledo, Ohio

- Henry Bergh Pyramid Mausoleum, Green-Wood Cemetery, Brooklyn, New York
- Bradbury Mausoleum, Mountain View Cemetery (Oakland, California)
- Leslie C. Brand, Brand Park, Glendale, California
- William Harry Brown Pyramid, Homewood Cemetery, Pittsburgh, Pennsylvania (1898–1899)
- Marcus Brown Pyramid, Oakhill Cemetery, Grand Rapids, Michigan, design inspired by Pyramid of Cestius in Rome
- Brunswig Mausoleum, Metairie Cemetery, New Orleans, Louisiana
- Nicolas Cage's Future Tomb, Saint Louis Cemetery No. 1, New Orleans, Louisiana
- Confederate Memorial Pyramid, Hollywood Cemetery, Richmond, Virginia
- Dorn Pyramid, Oddfellows Cemetery, San Luis Obispo, California
- Gardel Memorial, Mount Vernon Cemetery, Philadelphia, Pennsylvania
- Lewis Grigsby Crypt, Angelus-Rosedale Cemetery, Los Angeles, California
- John Gunckel Monument, Woodlawn Cemetery (Toledo, Ohio), Toledo, Ohio

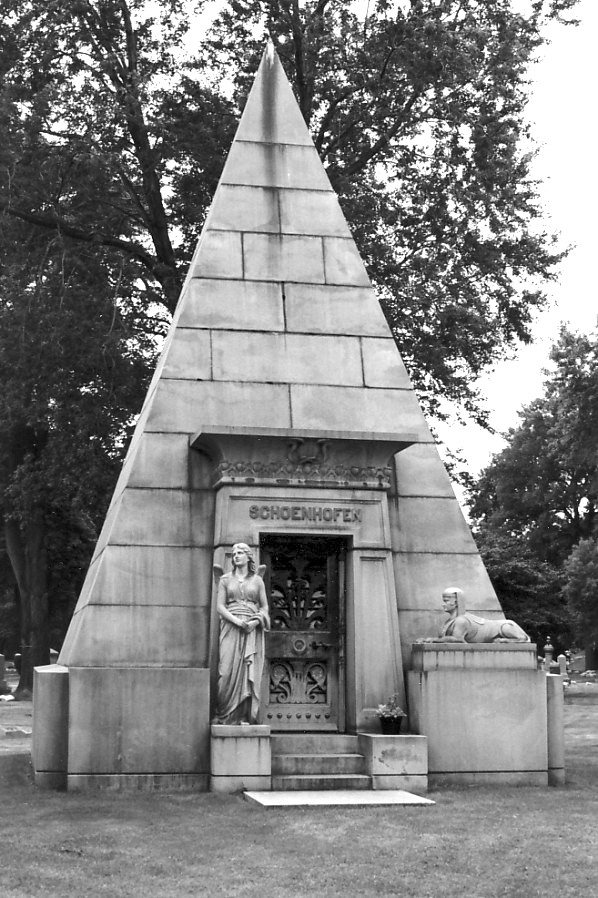
Schoenhofen Mausoleum

- Gwin Mausoleum, Mountain View Cemetery, Oakland, California
- Harms Family Mausoleum, Flower Hill Cemetery (North Bergen, New Jersey)
- Mark Howard Pyramid, Cedar Hill Cemetery, Hartford, Connecticut
- George W. P. Hunt, Hunt's Tomb, Phoenix, Arizona
- A.R.S. Hunter Pyramid, Murphy, North Carolina
- Pyramid tomb of Major E.C Lewis, Mt Olivet Cemetery, Nashville, TN
- Longstreet Mausoleum, Oakwood Cemetery, Syracuse, New York
- C.O.G. Miller Pyramid Mausoleum, Mountain View Cemetery, Oakland, California
- Mongin Family, Bonaventure Cemetery, Savannah, Georgia
- Charles Debrille Poston, Poston Butte, Florence, Arizona
- Rucker Family Tomb, Evergreen Cemetery, Everett, Washington
- Sahlberg Pyramid, Santa Barbara Cemetery, Santa Barbara, California
- Schoenhofen Pyramid Mausoleum, Graceland Cemetery, Chicago, Illinois
- Shatto family, Angelus-Rosedale Cemetery, Los Angeles, California
- Dr. Ira Smith's Pyramid, Grace Episcopal Church Cemetery, St. Francisville, Louisiana
- Wm. Smith's Pyramid, Magnolia Cemetery, Charleston, South Carolina
- Van Ness/Parsons Mausoleum, Green-Wood Cemetery, Brooklyn, NY
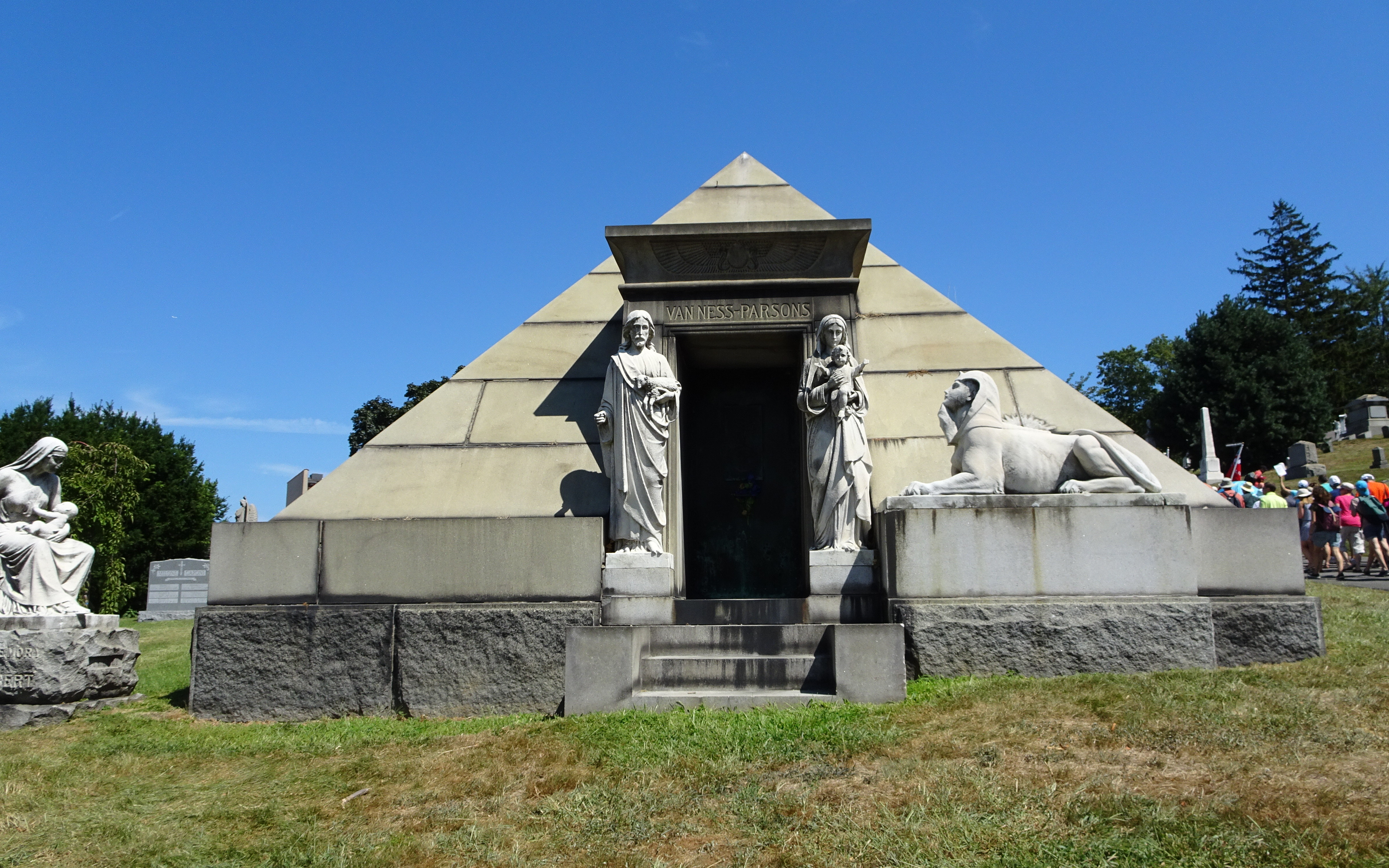
- Van Ness and Parsons, Brooklyn
  Vanderbilt family, Moravian Cemetery, Staten Island, NY
- Joel Parker Whitney, Spring Valley Ranch, Rocklin, California

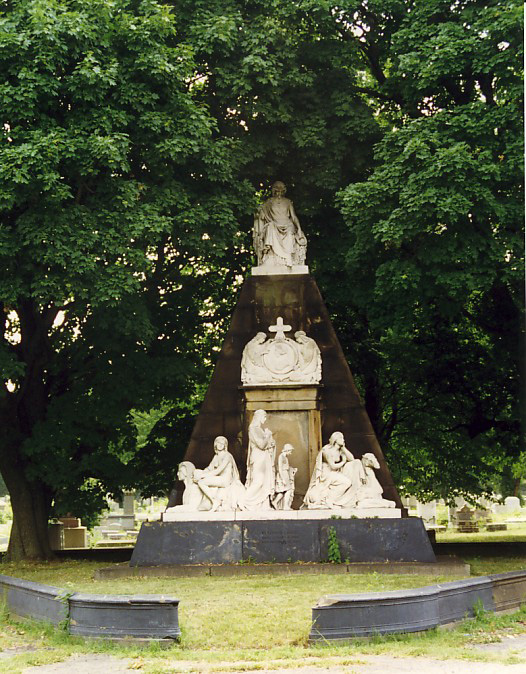
Gardel Memorial in Mount Vernon Cemetery, Philadelphia, Pennsylvania

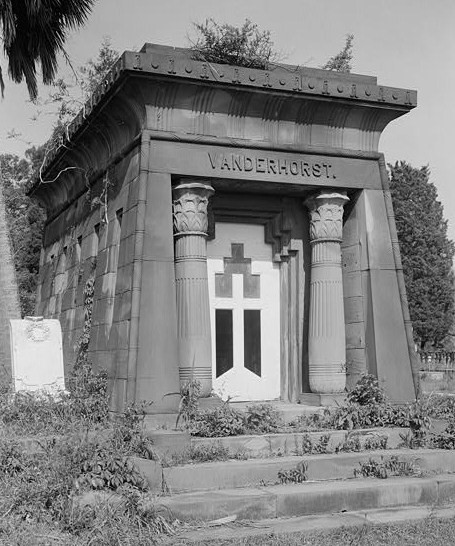
Vanderhorst Mausoleum at Magnolia Cemetery in Charleston, South Carolina is not a pyramid but is a similar example of "Egyptomania"

== Known but unidentified ==
- Spring Grove Cemetery, Cincinnati, Ohio

== Multiple burials ==
- Forest Lawn South, Miami, Florida
- Egbert Ludovicus Viele and his second wife, West Point, New York

== See also ==
- Lists of pyramids
- Mesoamerican pyramids
