= Schoenhofen Pyramid Mausoleum =

Historic site in Cook County, Illinois

- U.S. Historic district – Contributing property
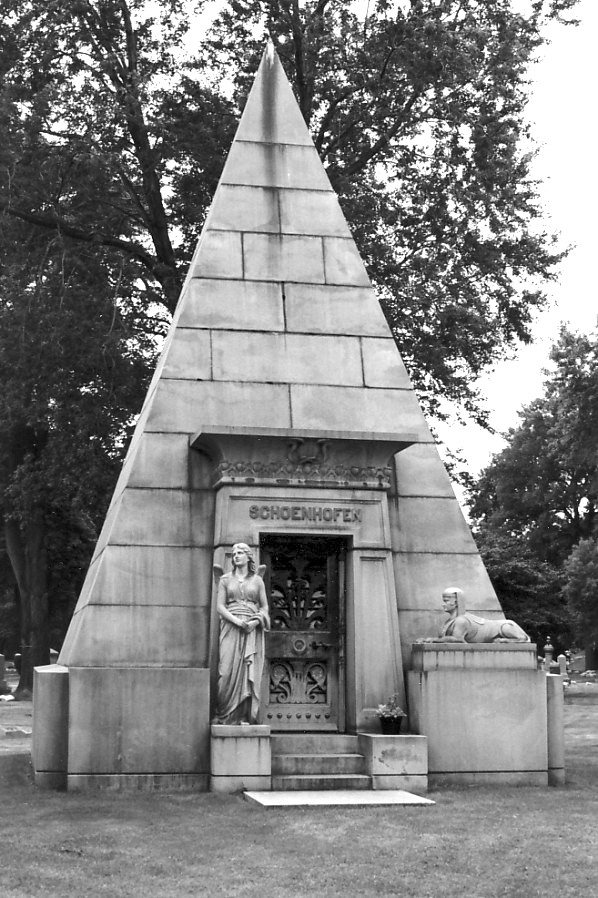
- Schoenhofen Mausoleum
- Location: Chicago, Cook County, Illinois, United States
- Built: 1893
- Architect: Richard E. Schmidt
- Architectural style: Egyptian Revival
- Part of: Graceland Cemetery (ID00001628)
- Added to NRHP: January 18, 2001

The Schoenhofen Pyramid Mausoleum is a tomb in Graceland Cemetery, Chicago. It was designed by Chicago School architect Richard E. Schmidt in the requested Egyptian Revival style as a family mausoleum for the Chicago brewer Peter Schoenhofen and built in 1893.

== History ==
Well-known Chicago brewer Peter Schoenhofen was born in Dörbach, then Prussia, in 1827 and died in 1893. His Schoenhofen Brewing Company was among the largest in Chicago in 1880. Schoenhofen's family mausoleum was designed by Richard E. Schmidt, a Chicago School architect, in 1893, with construction beginning on July 1 of that year. The mausoleum is internationally famous and is one of the most photographed mausoleums at Graceland Cemetery.

== Architecture ==
The Schoenhofen Pyramid Mausoleum is a steep sided tomb designed, like many of the monuments at Chicago's Graceland Cemetery, in the Egyptian Revival style. The tomb is a family mausoleum constructed from gray granite. The pyramid structure is set upon a square base. To the left of the entryway, is an angel, on the right of the entry stands a sphinx. The pyramid's design combines both Egyptian (the sphinx) and Christian (the angel) symbols. Regardless, the American Institute of Architects' Chicago guide book called the angel "rather out-of-place". The door to the pyramid is styled after the gateways at Karnak, in Egypt, and is 40 inches wide by 84 inches high. A bronze molding of bundled reeds surrounds the door and the door's themselves feature cast lotus designs with coiled asps around the handles.

While the Schoenhofen Mausoleum is a pyramid, and referred to as such, its design is only Egyptian-inspired. The angel on the tomb base is clearly not Egyptian and even the sphinx merely takes its inspiration from Egyptian architecture. There are several historical works that are considered related to the Schoenhofen Mausoleum. The Roman funerary pyramid of Caius Cestius is considered a historical predecessor to the Schoenhofen Mausoleum. Perhaps more closely related are the pyramid by Louis Carrogis Carmontelle at Parc Monceau in Paris and a cenotaph by Antonio Canova that was erected as the tomb of Maria Christina in Vienna at the Augustinian Church.

== See also ==
- List of pyramid mausoleums in North America
