= Pyramids of Meroë =

Pyramids in Sudan

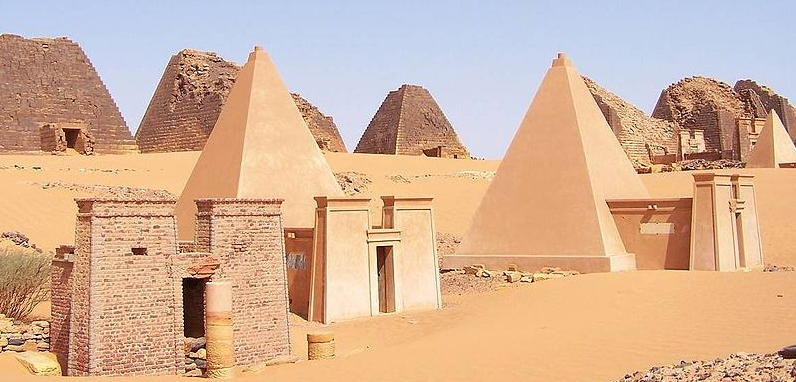
- Pyramids of Meroë

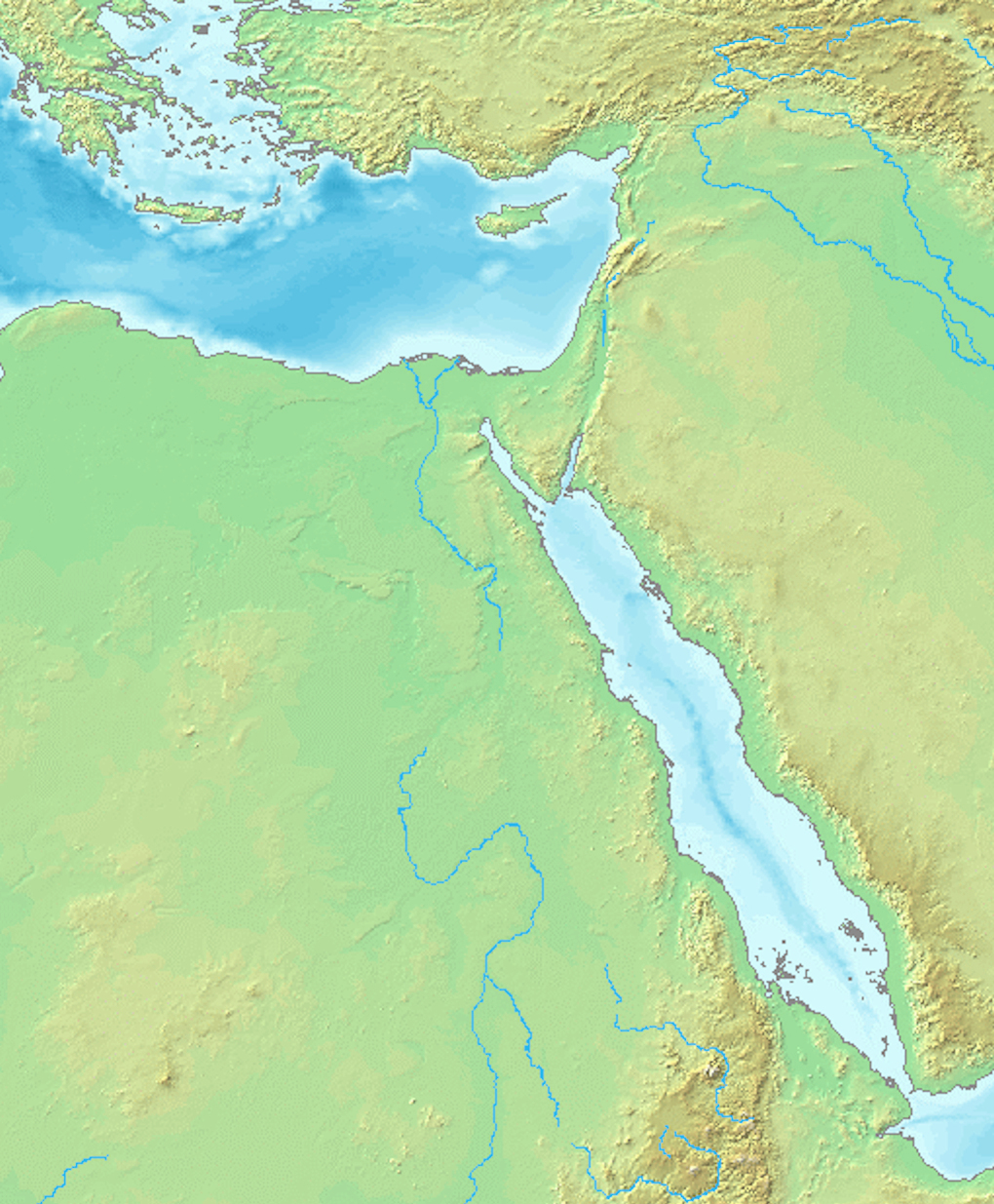
- Location within Northeast Africa Location within Sudan
- 16°56′18″N 33°44′57″E
- Type: Settlement
- Cultures: Nubian (Kingdom of Kush)
- Location: River Nile State, Sudan
- Region: Nubia

Site notes
- Condition: Ruins, partly restored

The Pyramids of Meroë are a large number of Nubian pyramids, encompassing three cemeteries near the ancient city of Meroë. They are located in Sudan, approximately 200 kilometres (120 mi) northeast of Khartoum, near the village of Bagrawiya. The three cemeteries (Bagrawiya North, South, and West) are spread across low hills covering roughly a quarter of a square kilometre. The Meroë pyramids date to the later stage of the Kingdom of Kush (3rd century BC–4th century AD) and were burial places for Kushite monarchs, other members of the royal family, and important officials and dignitaries.

The pyramids, mostly built of local sandstone (and in later periods of brick), are under 30 metres (98 ft) in height—significantly smaller than the well-known ancient Egyptian pyramids. They served as tombs for kings, queens, and high officials of the historical Kingdom of Kush in Nubia. Their construction spans from approximately 300 BC to around 300 AD. The first pyramid at Meroë that can be securely attributed to a ruler belongs to Ergamenes (Arakamani), who reigned around 280 BC.

The three cemeteries collectively encompass over a thousand graves, out of which at least 147 were pyramids. The majority of the pyramids (at least 82) are from the western cemetery and were not burials of royals.

The Pyramids of Meroë have been a UNESCO World Heritage Site since 2011. On 8 September 2020, the pyramids were threatened for the first time by floods.

== Origins ==
In all areas of life, particularly in the culture of Nubia's ruling class, a strong orientation towards Egypt can be observed. Religious beliefs and material culture were dominated by the northern neighbour, especially at the beginning of Nubian independent statehood. In this context, the practice of burial in pyramids was likely adopted by the ruling class (see Nubian pyramids). However, it was not only the architectural forms that were borrowed from Egypt, but also the belief in an afterlife. Insofar as written sources are available, nearly the same rites and customs as in Egypt can be identified. Above all, it was considered important to preserve the memory of the deceased. To this end, offerings were made to the dead and above-ground funerary structures—pyramids with accompanying mortuary temples—were erected. The chief funerary deity was, as in Egypt, Osiris, who otherwise appears to have had no independent temple or cult in Nubia. Other funerary deities included Isis and Anubis, who are frequently mentioned in Nubian funerary texts and thus also in the pyramid temples. Isis and Anubis in particular were invoked in requests for bread and water, intended to ensure the provision of nourishment for all eternity.

== Structure of the pyramids ==
Each pyramid complex consists of three parts:

1. The pyramid itself, which was initially constructed from local sandstone and in later periods also from bricks. The pyramids average between 10 and 30 metres (33 and 98 ft) in height.
2. In front of the pyramid stands a small mortuary temple, usually richly decorated with reliefs. Here the deceased is named and depicted in scenes from the underworld or alongside deities. The entire pyramid complex was sometimes enclosed by a wall.
3. The actual burial chambers lie beneath the pyramid. The entrance is located in front of the temple; there are never chambers within the pyramid structure itself. Kings had a burial system of three chambers, with the first two often decorated with pillars. The deceased was interred in the last chamber. Queens, by contrast, had only two subterranean chambers, and later kings also had only two-chamber tombs.

The pyramids at Meroë are distinguished by their steep angle of 72 degrees (compared to the approximately 54-degree angle of Egyptian pyramids), and they are considerably smaller. Most were not faced smooth but stepped, and they apparently had no pointed apex; instead, they were slightly flattened at the top, perhaps crowned with a small, flat cylinder. They stood on a low base.

The royal pyramids of Meroë can be divided into two groups based on size. The first group dates from Ergamenes (c. 280 BC) to Amanishakheto (end of the 1st century BC), with an average side length of 18 metres (59 ft). In the second group (from Natakamani, c. 50 CE onwards), the average side length is only 6.6 metres (22 ft). During this later period, pyramid construction evidently declined in importance. At the same time, the pyramids of queens (Kandakes) were built larger than those of the kings.

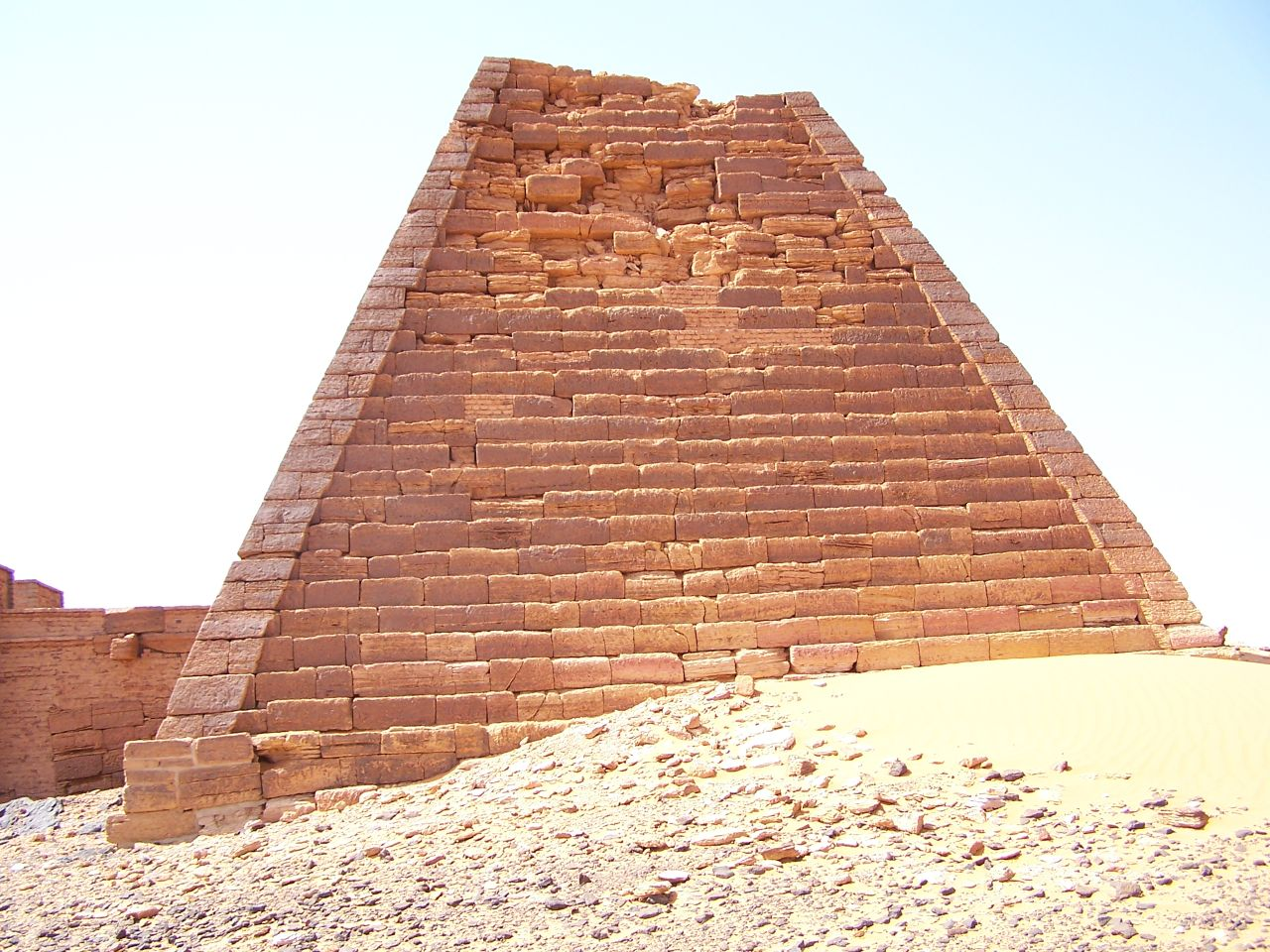
Pyramid N21 from the side, stepped form

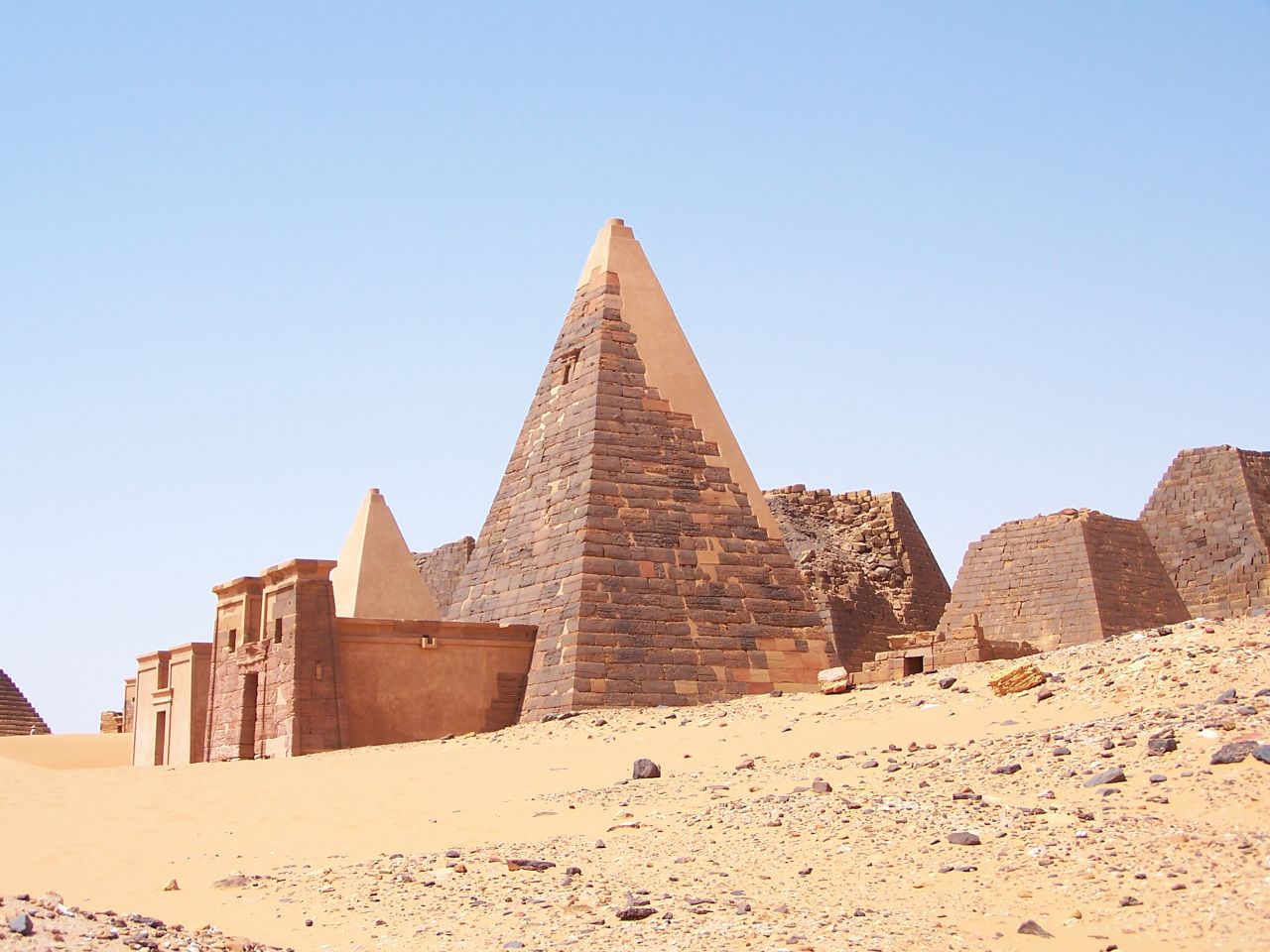
Pyramid N19 from the side, smooth-faced form

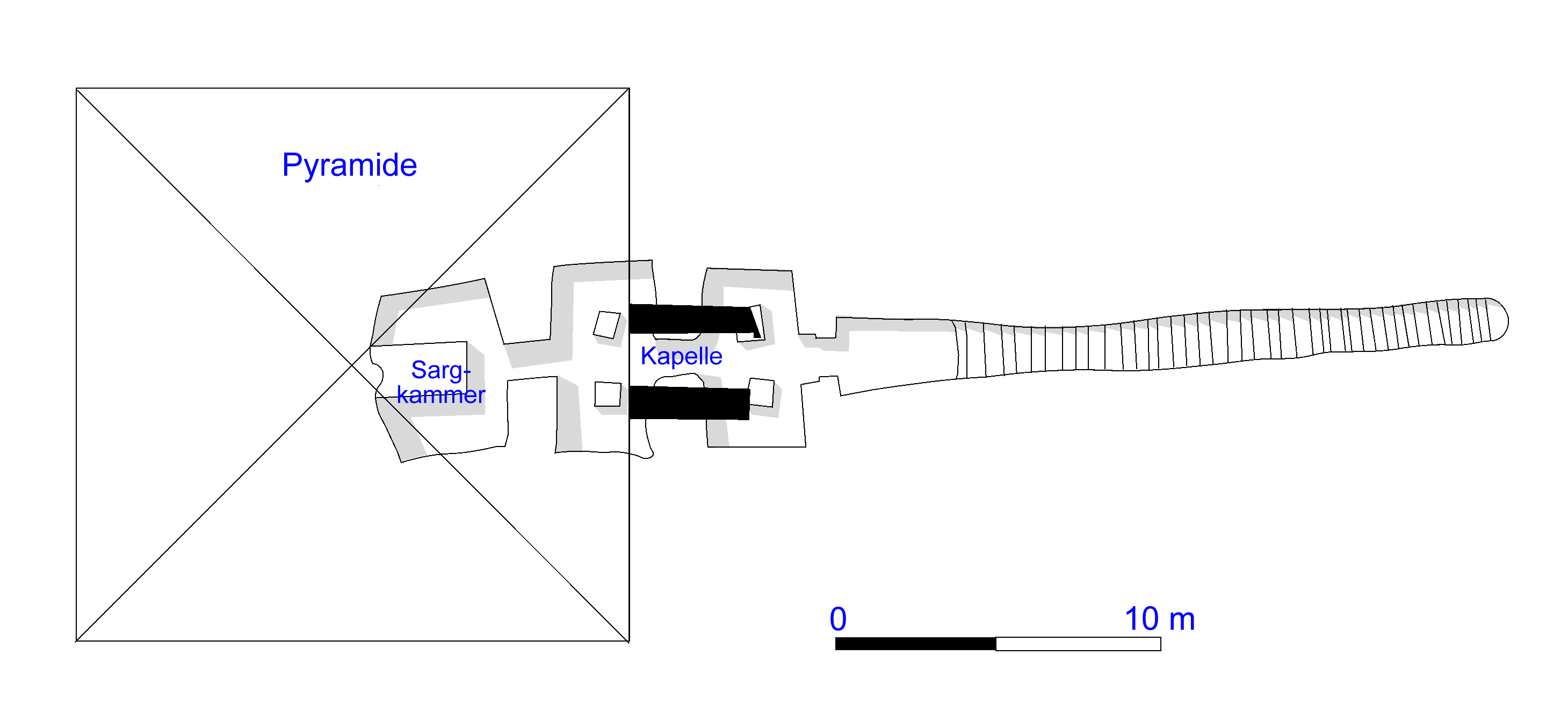
Plan of Pyramid N7

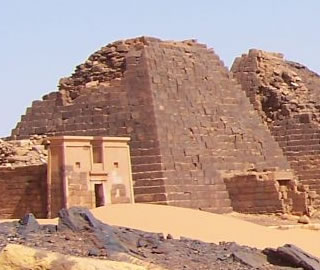
From left to right: Chapel of Pyramid N6, Pyramid N7

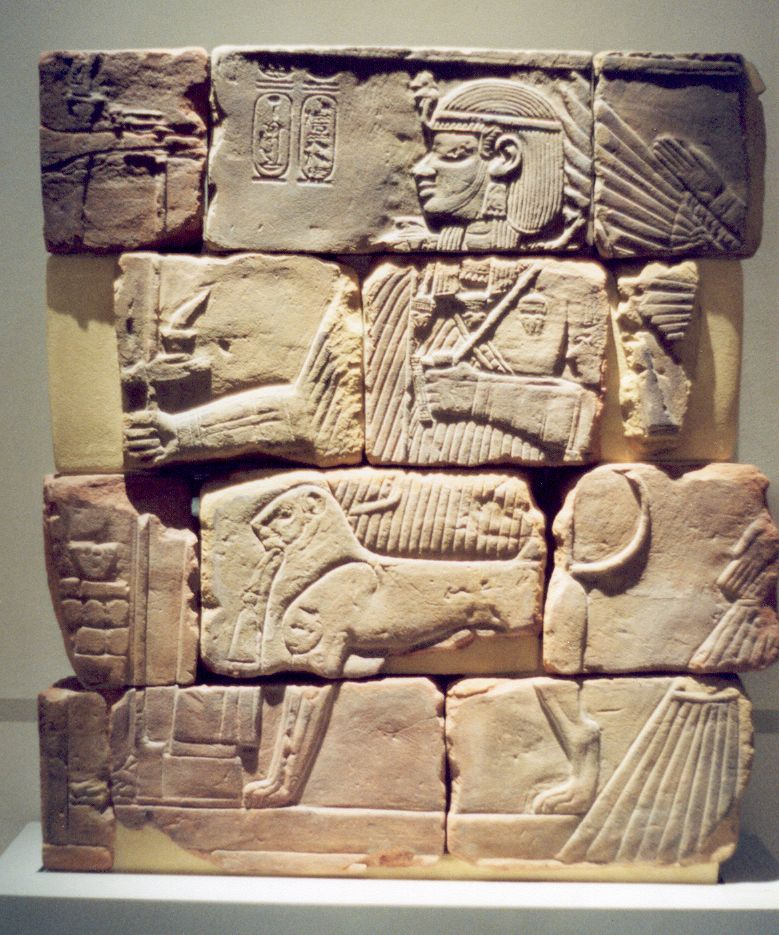
A relief from the chapel of Pyramid N17 (now in the Egyptian Museum of Berlin)

== Decoration of the mortuary temples ==
The mortuary temples in front of the pyramids are built of sandstone. They usually consist of one or two rooms, preceded by a pylon. These temples are richly decorated. On the exterior of the pylon, a shallow sunk relief is carved, often—but not always—showing the king smiting enemies, an ancient motif borrowed from the Egyptians. The interior of the temple is also adorned with shallow raised relief. Three decoration types can be distinguished:

- Type A dates to the 3rd century BC. It shows offering scenes in the Egyptian style, with Egyptian hieroglyphs.
- Type B dates from the 2nd century BC to the 1st century AD. Here one finds the judgment of the dead and scenes from the Book of the Dead, which had been part of the standard repertoire of tomb decoration in Egypt since approximately 1350 BC. Before the tribunal of the dead, the heart of the deceased had to defend itself and prove that the deceased had performed more good than bad deeds in life. Good and bad deeds were weighed on a scale, with the heart serving as the counterweight. Only if the deceased was found innocent in this tribunal—presided over by Osiris as judge—could they enter the underworld for all eternity. If found guilty, the "Devourer of the Dead" (Ammit) would consume them and the deceased would die an eternal death.
- Type C begins with Natakamani. The side walls are now dominated by the tomb owner, depicted seated. The tomb owners typically wear festive garments and are richly adorned with various jewellery. Behind the deceased often stand Isis and Nephthys, though queens may also appear. Before them appears a prince or Anubis, offering incense or a water libation to the deceased. The rear wall of the chapel shows the underworld god Osiris or a false door, through which the deceased was symbolically able to leave the tomb.

== Grave goods ==
Most of the pyramids were found to have been robbed, making it only partially possible to reconstruct the original furnishing of the burial chambers. The only unplundered pyramid belongs to Queen Mernua (c. 600 BC). However, her tomb dates to the very beginning of the cemetery, approximately 300 years before the royal pyramids, so while her burial is likely typical of her era, it is not representative of the majority of burials at Meroë. Mernua was buried in a purely Egyptian style. She lay in multiple nested coffins. Her mummy was richly decorated with amulets, and the tomb contained numerous ushabtis bearing her name. The majority of the grave goods had been specifically produced for the burial.

The later burials differ markedly. Ushabtis are absent; coffins are rarely attested (though originally present ones may have deteriorated due to poor preservation conditions), and there are no remains of mummy masks. Most burial objects were taken from daily life. Many luxury items imported from the Hellenistic world are found, including metal vessels, bronze sculptures, and much Hellenistic pottery, among which are wine amphorae. There is evidence of jewellery that was likely worn during the owner's lifetime, as well as furniture placed in the tomb. Although amulets in the Egyptian style continued to appear, burial customs at Meroë increasingly diverged from Egyptian practice from the 3rd century BC onwards. Nevertheless, the depictions in the pyramid chapels show that Egyptian religious beliefs continued to be maintained: Osiris, Isis, and the judgment of the dead—the characteristic representations of that era's Egyptian funerary art—appear repeatedly in these scenes. There are indications, though only subtle ones, that servants and animals were buried alongside rulers. Many burial chambers contained more than one body. Animal burials were also found in the vicinity of the pyramids.

== Exploration ==
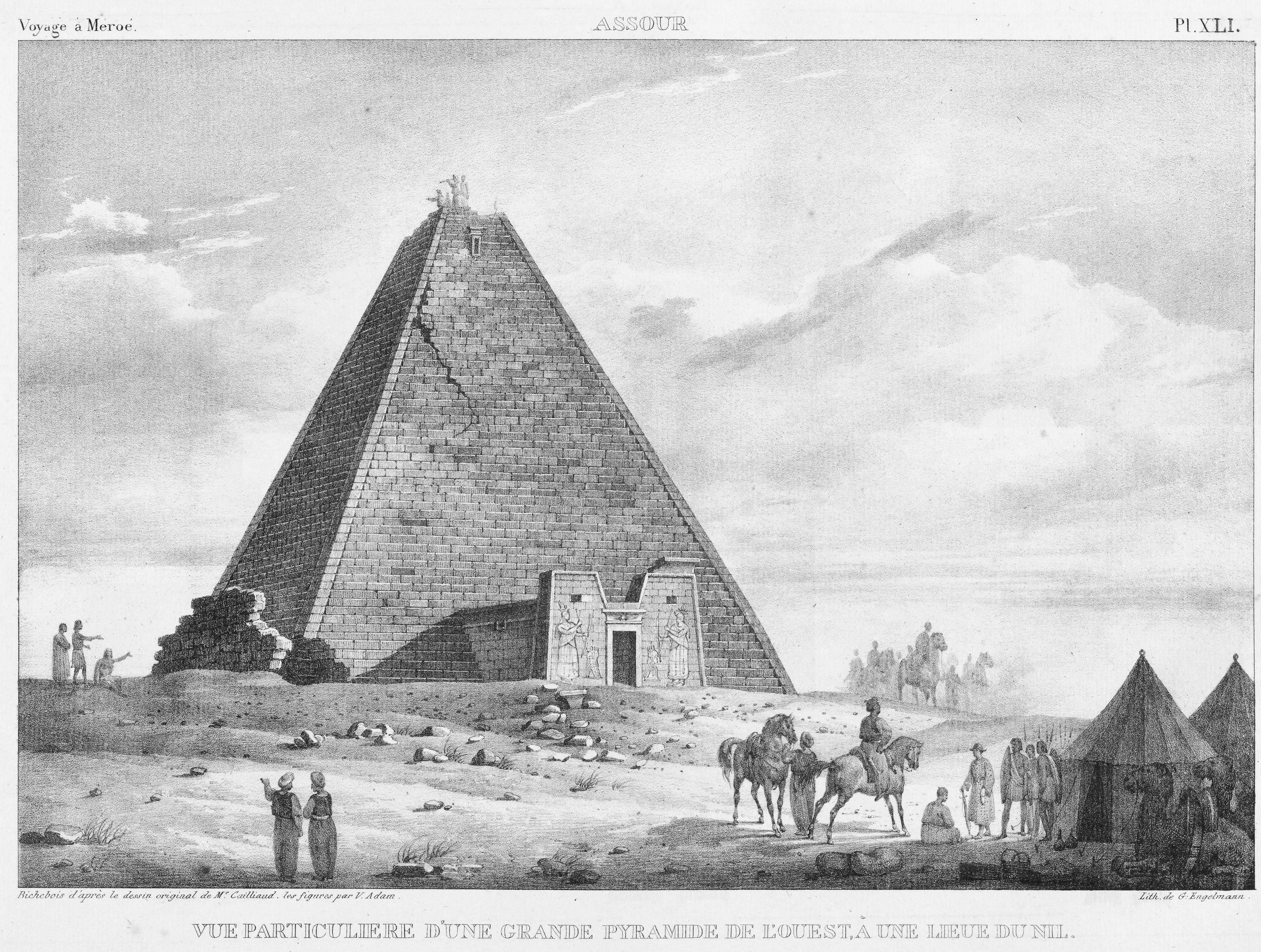
The great pyramid N6 in 1821, before its destruction by Ferlini

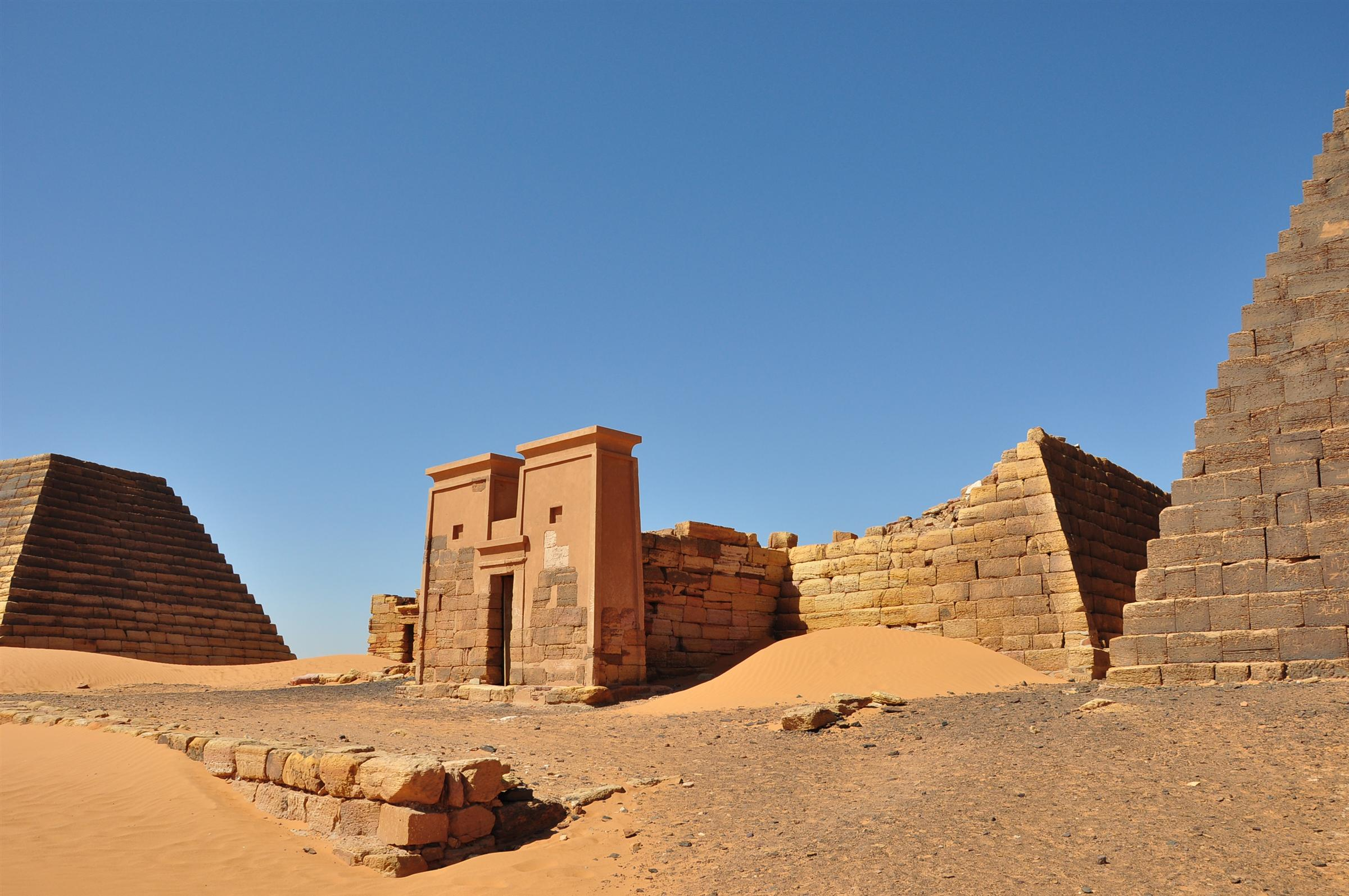
Pyramid N6 after its near-total destruction by Ferlini

The Italian physician and adventurer Giuseppe Ferlini travelled to Meroë in 1834, where he had official permission from the Governor-General of Sudan, Ali Khurshid Pasha, to search for treasure. His methods were extremely destructive: he had the pyramids dismantled from the top down and used explosives to reach potential treasures more quickly. In the process, he destroyed more than 40 of the Nubian pyramids. Ferlini discovered jewellery belonging to Queen Amanishakheto and attempted to sell the pieces to various museums, but at the time no one in Europe believed that such high-quality objects could originate from Sub-Saharan Africa. Eventually, the pieces were purchased by Berlin and Munich, where they remain today.

A decade later, the Prussian expedition to Egypt under Karl Richard Lepsius surveyed the pyramids. The cemetery was systematically examined, a plan was drawn up, and many of the depictions in the pyramid temples were copied.

In the 1920s, the pyramid fields were systematically excavated by George Andrew Reisner, who made exceptionally rich finds. In contrast to the earlier burials at Nuri or El-Kurru, the classic Meroitic burial chambers contained few objects specifically made for funerary purposes; everyday items used as grave goods dominate, including many imports from the Mediterranean world. The finds were divided primarily between Khartoum and the Museum of Fine Arts, Boston. Reisner's work was published by Dows Dunham in several monumental volumes in the 1950s and 1960s. Reisner had been primarily interested in excavating the burial chambers and neglected the pyramids themselves. The decorations of the funerary pyramids and their architecture have therefore still not been systematically analysed and presented in scholarly publications. In recent years, some of the pyramids have been restored by the German architect and archaeologist Friedrich Hinkel.

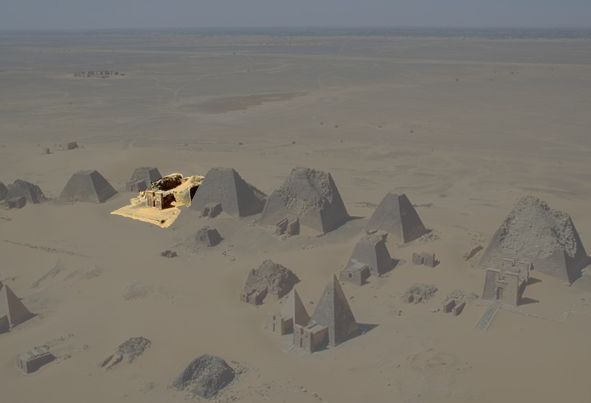
Pyramid N6, nearly completely destroyed by Giuseppe Ferlini in 1834

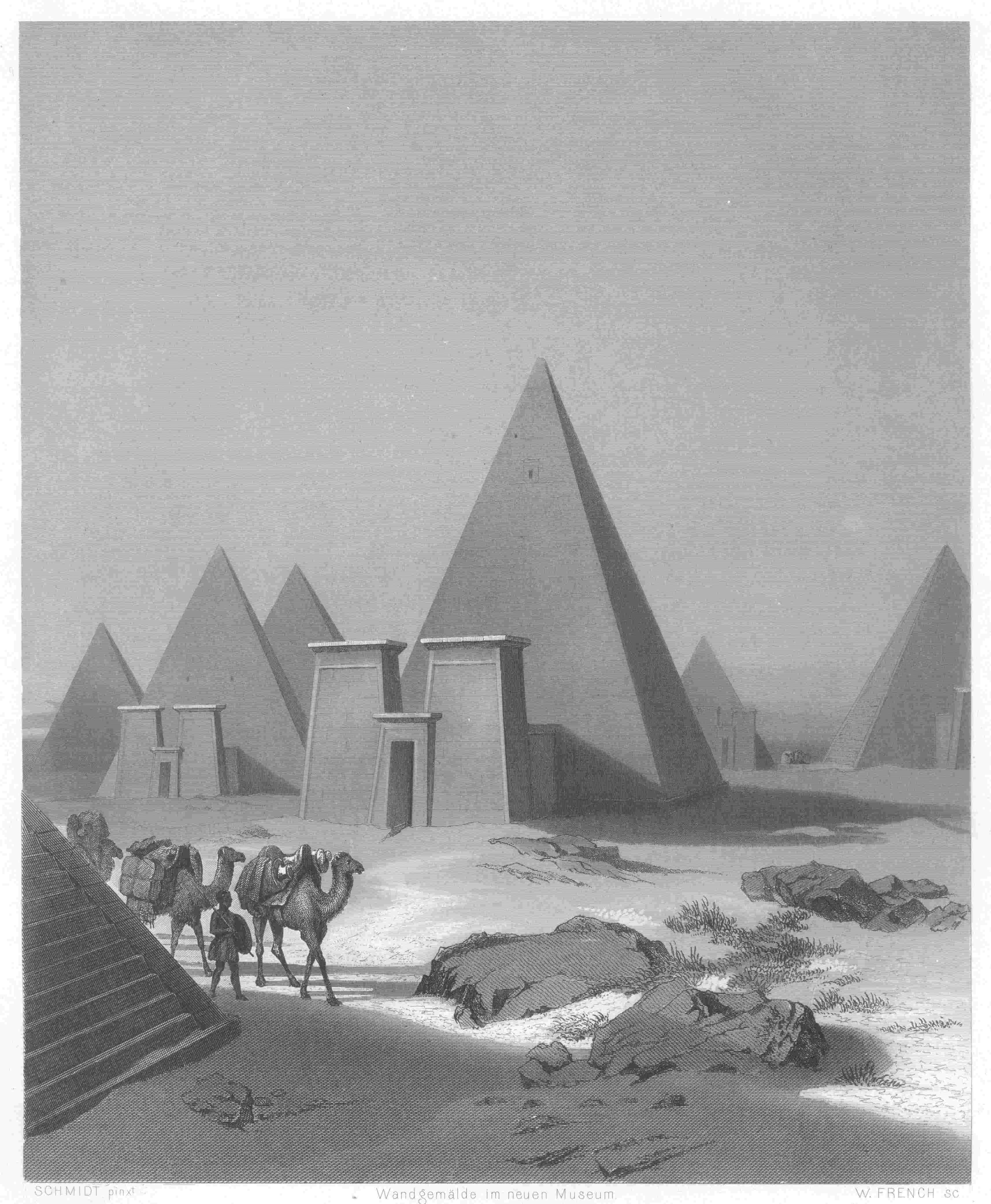
Impression of the pyramids c. 1850, based on reports from the Lepsius expedition

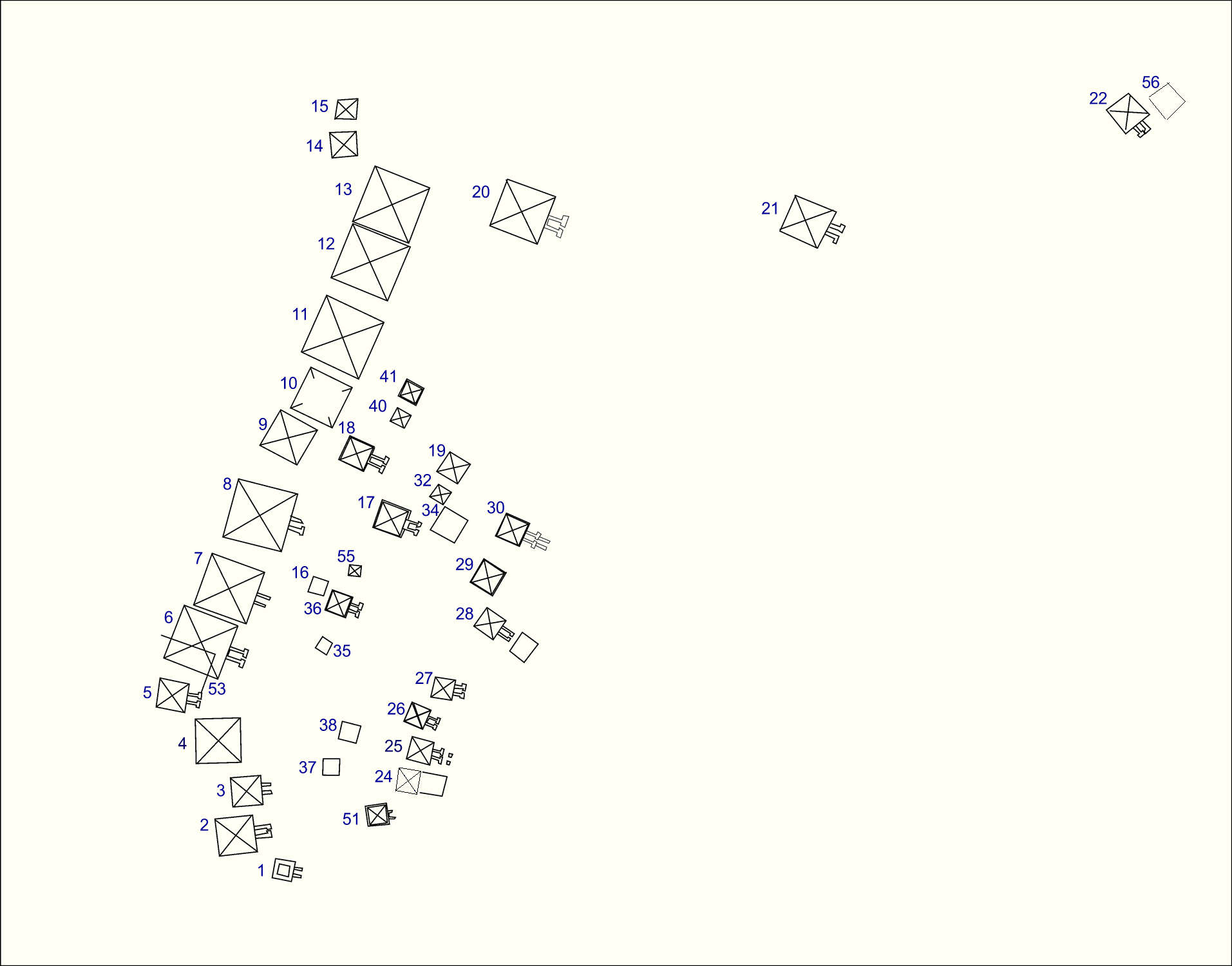
Numbered plan of the North Cemetery after George Andrew Reisner

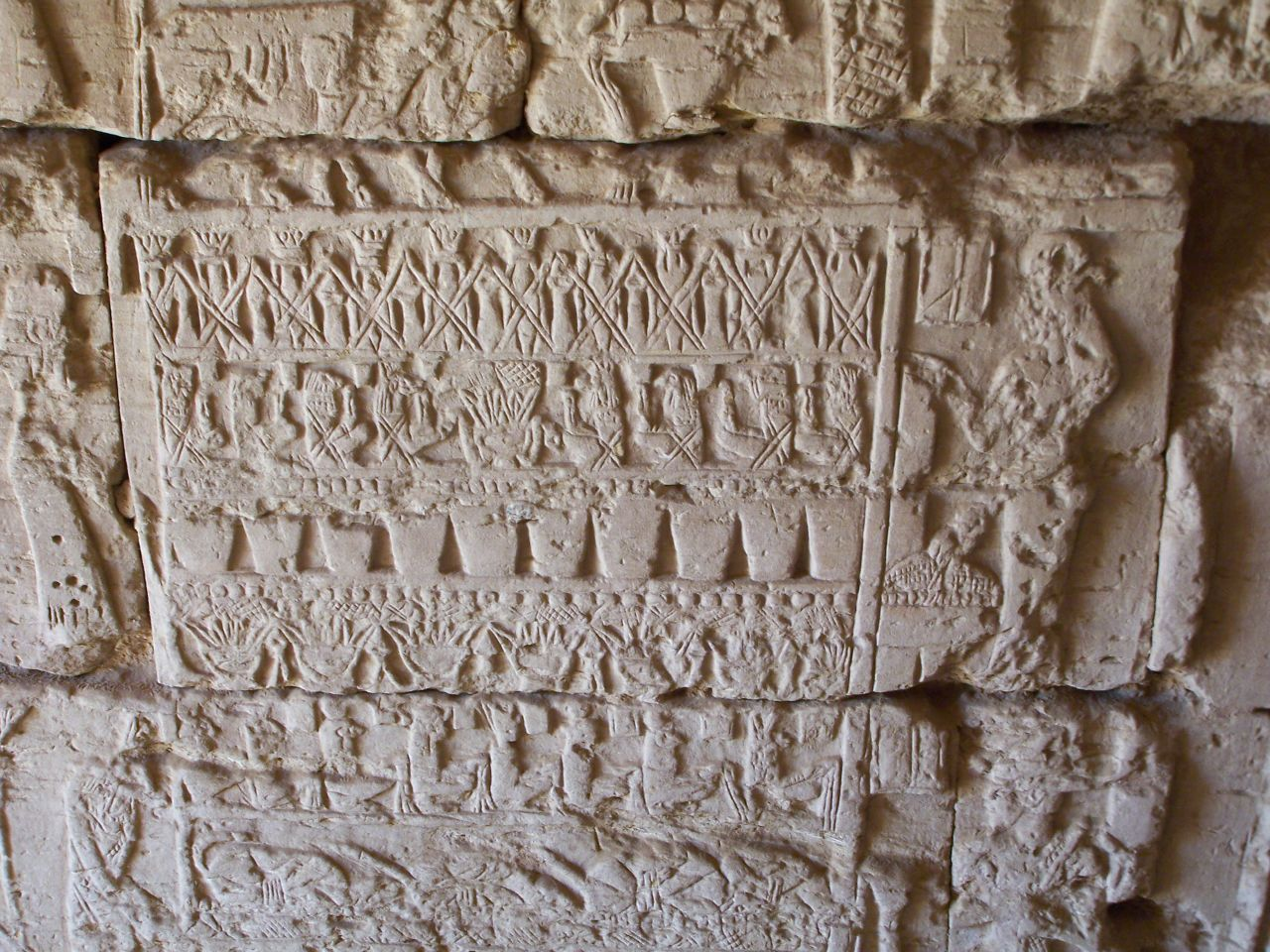
Depiction of offerings in the pyramid temple of Pyramid N12

== Pyramids and burials ==
Meroë and its cemeteries

The abbreviation Beg stands for Bagrawiya, N for North Cemetery, S for South Cemetery, and W for West Cemetery. Burials of high-ranking individuals took place in the South Cemetery from at least the time of Aspelta (c. 580 BC). Ergamenes (c. 280 BC) is the first ruler buried there. Around 250 BC, the South Cemetery was abandoned and the North Cemetery was used as the burial place for kings. Not all pyramids belonged to kings or queens. The West Cemetery is a further burial ground containing a large number of pyramids. It appears to have been used for high dignitaries and their family members; a few pyramids there may possibly be royal.

The first numbering of the pyramids comes from the Lepsius expedition. The current numbering system follows George Andrew Reisner. Not all pyramids can be assigned to an owner. The names of the owners are usually preserved in the small pyramid temples—if these are destroyed, there is little basis for identification. Rarely were inscribed objects found in the burial chambers, so finds there offer little help. Most pyramids were equipped with an inscribed offering table naming the tomb's occupant, though offering tables are objects that could easily have been moved, making their findspots only a rough indicator.

Securely identified pyramids are marked with bold text.

=== Southern cemetery ===
The southern cemetery was used for royal Kushite burials for the first two or three generations in the Meroitic period (270 BC onwards). The southern cemetery includes c. 220 burials, at least 90 of which had superstructures. Of these 90, at least 24 were pyramids. The tombs in this cemetery have been heavily pillaged.

Designation	Owner	Notes	Side length
Beg. S 1	Woman (name unknown)		6.50 m
Beg. S 2	Woman (name unknown)		6.62 m
Beg. S 3	Unknown		7.65 m
Beg. S 4	Queen (non-ruling) Kanarta (Sar...tin)		6.65 m
Beg. S 5	King Amanislo		
Beg. S 6	King Arakamani		
Beg. S 7	The soldier Hordepy (?)		
Beg. S 8	Queen (name unknown)		
Beg. S 9	Unknown		7.50 m
Beg. S 10	Queen (non-ruling) Bartare (a.k.a. Karatari)		10.45 m
Beg. S 15	Pasalta	Name found on a stele	
Beg. S 20	Prince Weterik		4.75 m
Beg. S 84	Malenadan	Name found on ushabtis	5.20 m
Beg. S 85	Queen Mernua	Tomb found unplundered	5.25 m
Beg. S 500	King's brother Karyben		5.35 m
Beg. S 503	Queen (non-ruling) Khennuwa		10.25 m

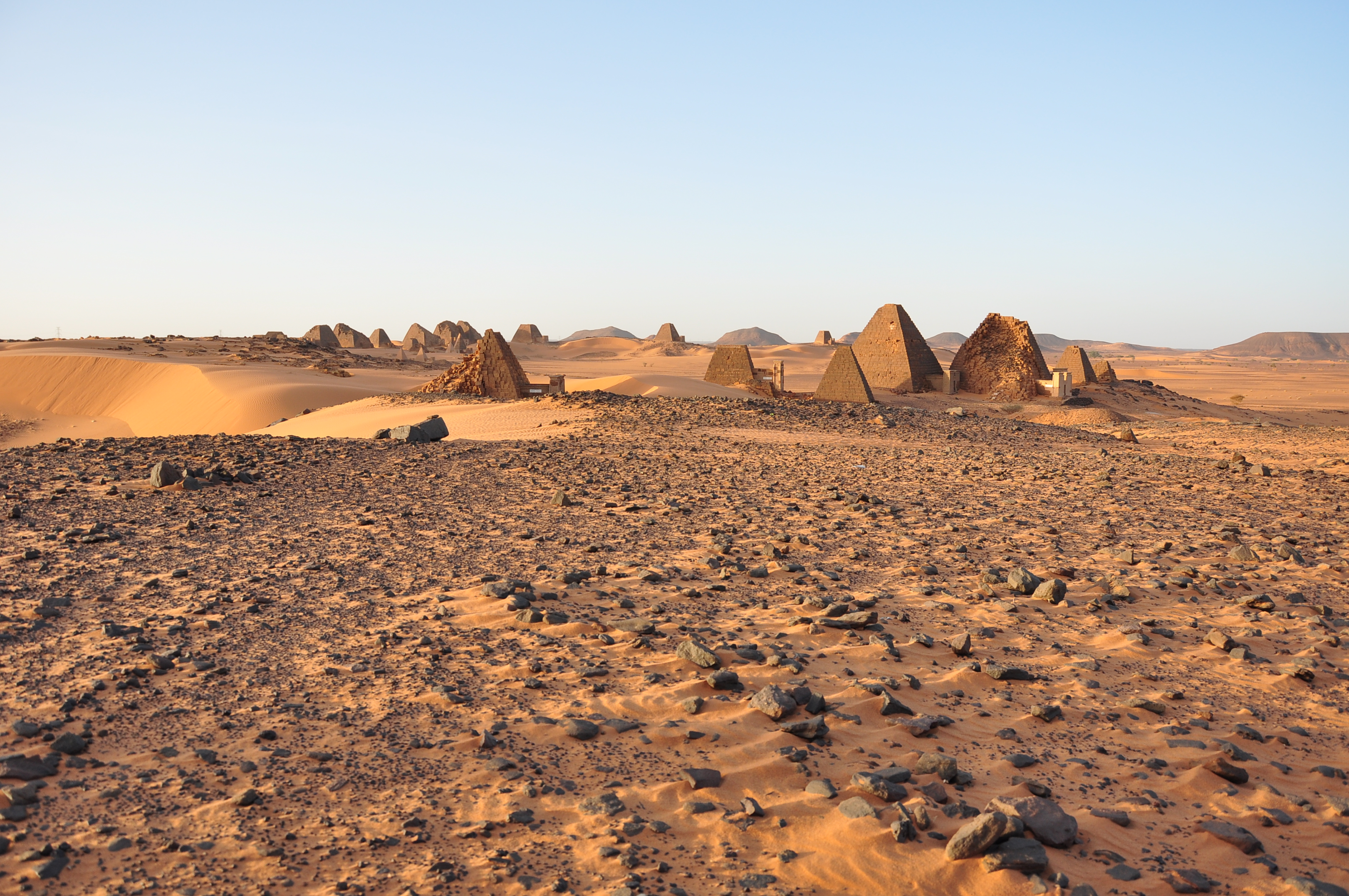
The Southern Cemetery of Meroë

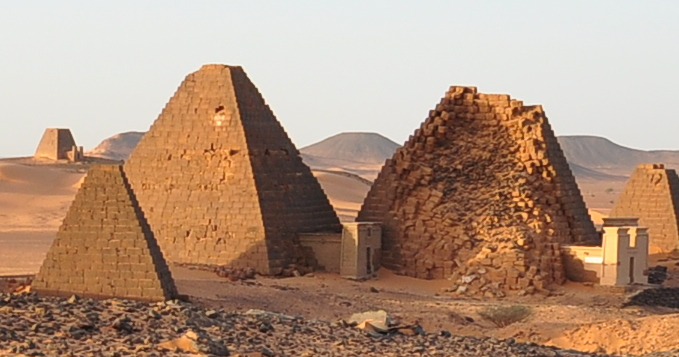
Detail of the Southern Cemetery. The large pyramids belong to Kings Arqamani and Amanislo

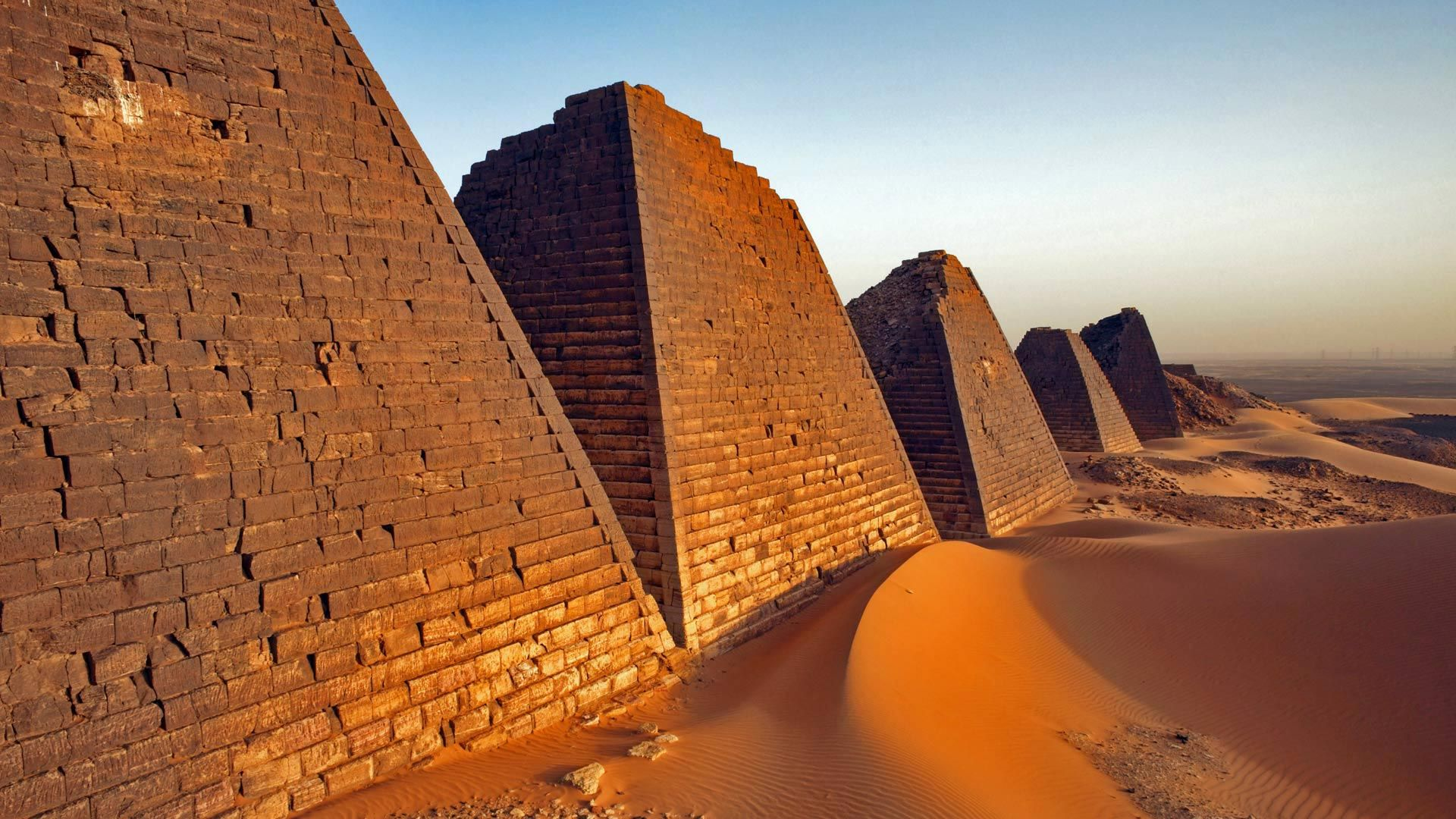
The Pyramids of Meroë

=== Northern cemetery ===
After briefly using the southern cemetery, the northern cemetery became the main site for royal burials. The northern cemetery contains 41 known pyramids, from 30 kings, eight queens regnant, and three other individuals (crown princes?).

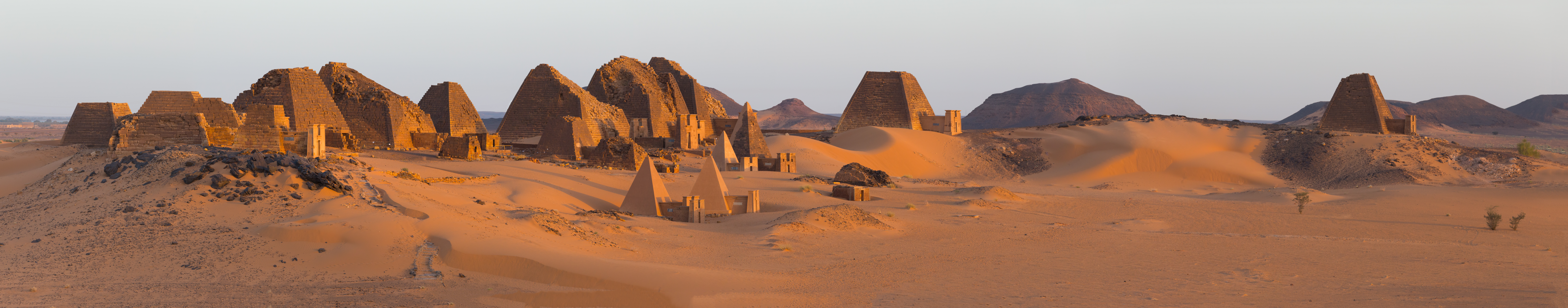
Pyramids of Meroë (North Cemetery) at sunrise

Destructions
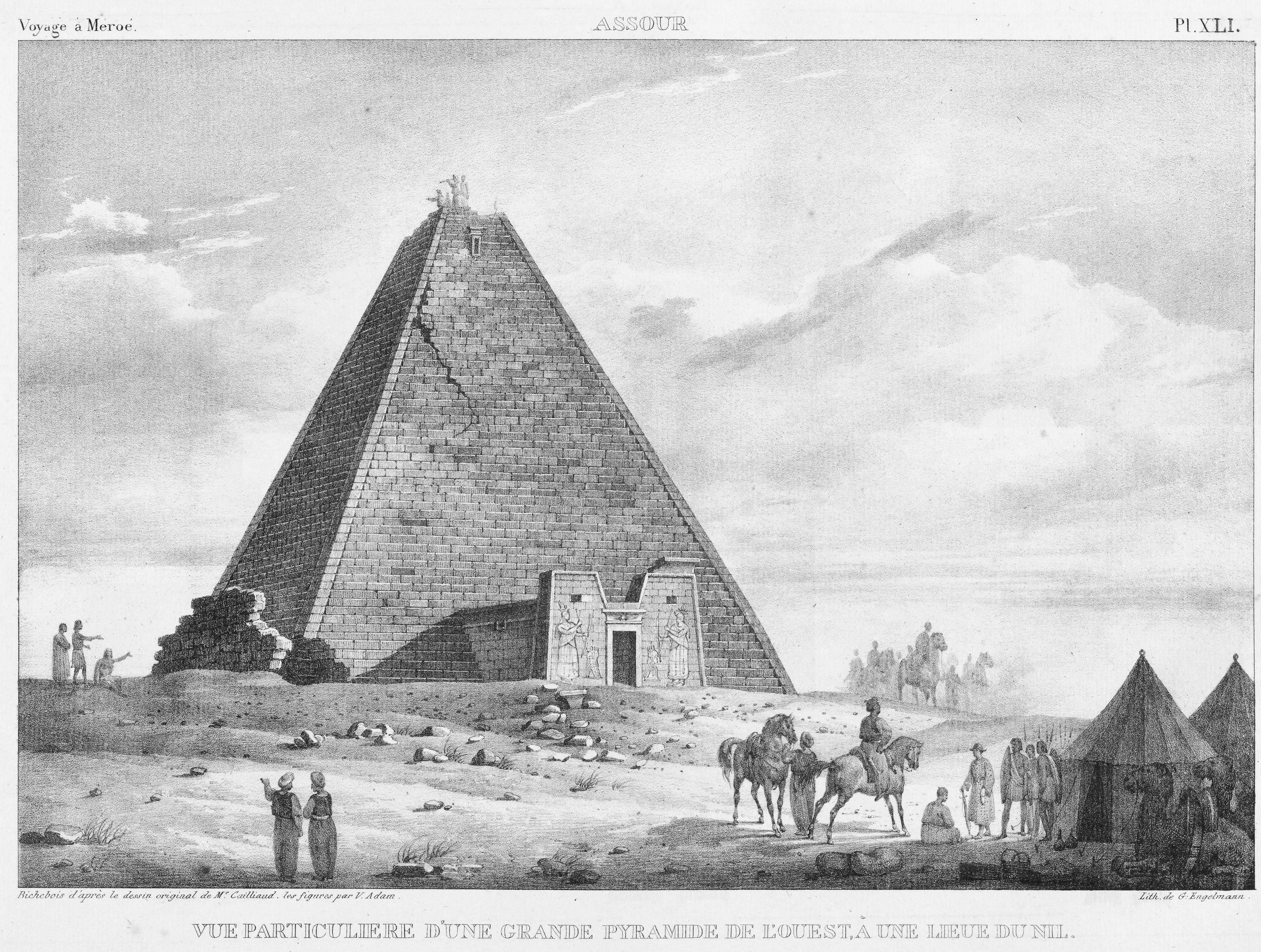
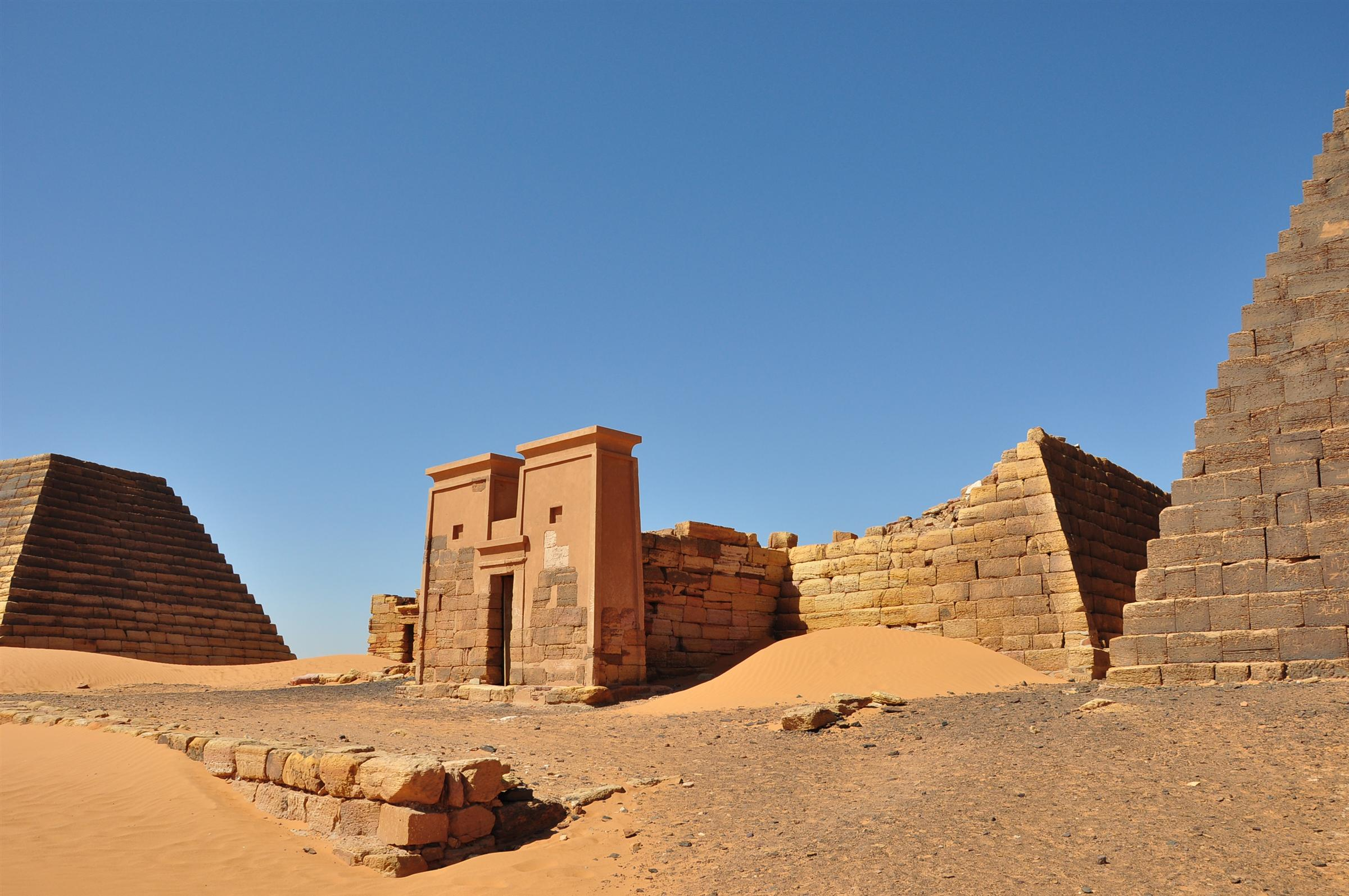
Great pyramid N6, belonging to Queen Amanishakheto, before and after its destruction by the treasure-hunter Giuseppe Ferlini in the 1830s

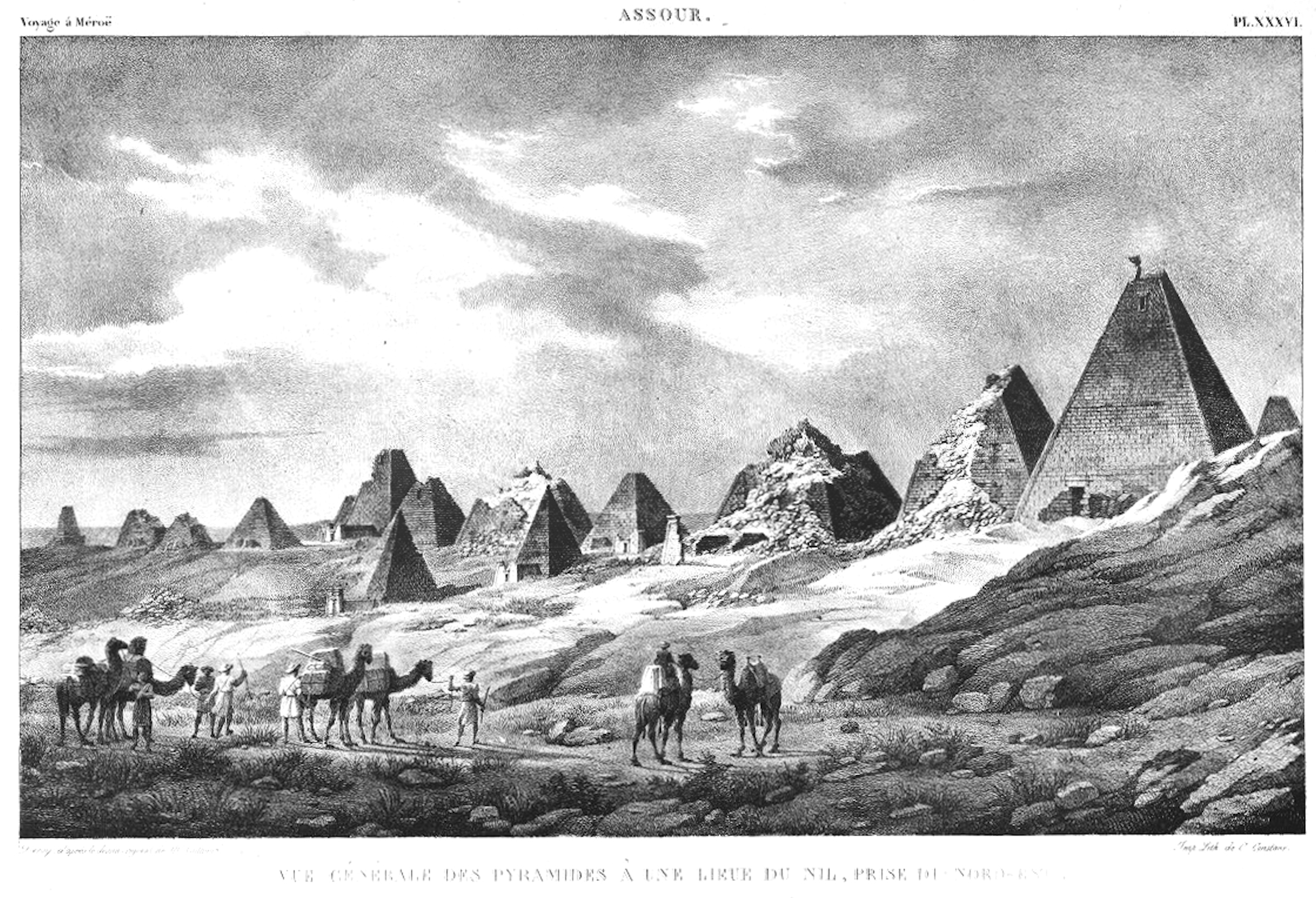
Nubian pyramids of Meroë in 1821, by Frédéric Cailliaud

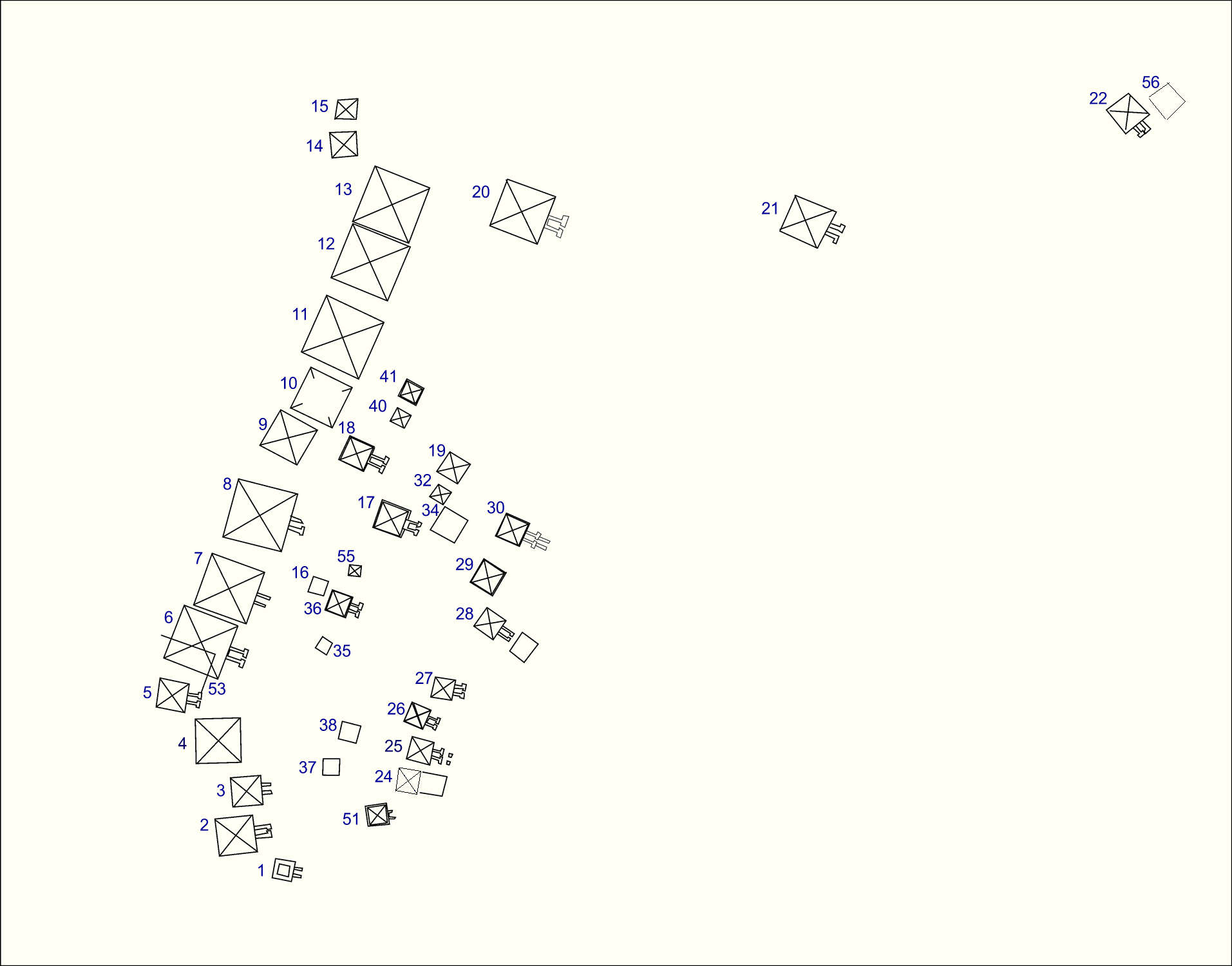
The North Cemetery

Designation	Owner	Notes	Side length	Lepsius No.
Beg. N 1	Queen Amanitore	Not a true pyramid		20
Beg. N 2	Unidentified king, perhaps King Amanikhabale	Attribution uncertain	11.72 m	19
Beg. N 3	Queen (name unknown)		9.10 m	18
Beg. N 4	King Amantekha		13.68 m	17
Beg. N 5	Unidentified, perhaps Prince Arikhankharer	Prince or general	8.98 m	16
Beg. N 6	Queen Amanishakheto	Nearly completely destroyed by Giuseppe Ferlini	17.68 m	15
Beg. N 7	King Arqamani		17.16 m	14
Beg. N 8	King (...)mr(...)t	Perhaps identical with Adikhalamani. Contains a stone-carved socle in the burial chamber, richly decorated with reliefs of deities.	18.50 m	13
Beg. N 9	King Tabirqo	Perhaps identical with Adikhalamani. Burial chamber was painted.	12.59 m	12
Beg. N 10	Unidentified king	Unused tomb	14.26 m	11
Beg. N 11	Unidentified queen regnant, perhaps Queen Nahirqo	Largest pyramid in the northern cemetery. Sarcophagus lid depicts Osiris between Isis and Nephthys.	19.29 m	10
Beg. N 12	Unidentified king, perhaps King Tanyidamani		18.75 m	9
Beg. N 13	Unidentified king, likely King Naqyrinsan		18.35 m	8
Beg. N 14	Unidentified, perhaps an unidentified king		8.85 m	7
Beg. N 15	Unidentified, perhaps an unidentified ruler		6.20 m	6
Beg. N 16	Unidentified king; perhaps King Amanikhareqerem (original) and King Aryesbokhe (rebuilt)	Rebuilt at a later time. Blocks with the name of Amanikhareqerem found here.	4.74 m	37
Beg. N 17	King Amanitenmemide		8.75 m	38
Beg. N 18	Queen Amanikhatashan		7.80 m	39
Beg. N 19	King Tarekeniwal		7.29 m	31
Beg. N 20	Unidentified king with the Horus name k_{3}-nht	Perhaps King Teriteqas	18.75 m	3
Beg. N 21	Unidentified ruler	Perhaps Queen Shanakdakhete	12.72 m	2
Beg. N 22	King Natakamani	This pyramid stands apart from the main pyramid field.	8.92 m	1
Beg. N 23	Unknown			
Beg. N 24	Unidentified, perhaps an unidentified king		6.28 m	22
Beg. N 25	Unidentified queen regnant	Perhaps Queen Amanipilade. Pyramid has completely vanished; only the entrance to the burial chapel survives.	7.12 m	23
Beg. N 26	Unidentified queen regnant	Perhaps Queen Patrapeamani	6.30 m	25
Beg. N 27	Unidentified king, perhaps King Tamelerdeamani	Brick pyramid	6.60 m	26
Beg. N 28	King Teqorideamani	Last securely datable pyramid at Meroë	7.10 m	27
Beg. N 29	King Takideamani		7.20 m	28
Beg. N 30	Unidentified, perhaps an unidentified king		7.30 m	29
Beg. N 31	Queen (name unknown)			
Beg. N 32	Unidentified queen regnant, perhaps Queen Amanikhalika		4.50 m	32
Beg. N 33	Unknown			
Beg. N 34	Unidentified king, perhaps King Aritenyesbokhe		8.30 m	30, 33, or 34?
Beg. N 35	Unidentified, perhaps an unidentified king			35
Beg. N 36	Unidentified king, perhaps King Amanitaraqide		6.34 m	36
Beg. N 37	Unidentified king, perhaps King (.)p(...)niñ		5.20 m	24b?
Beg. N 38	Unidentified king, perhaps King (...)k(...)	Brick pyramid	5.60 m	24
Beg. N 39	Unknown	Brick pyramid		
Beg. N 40	Unidentified, perhaps an unidentified king	Brick pyramid	4.97 m	40
Beg. N 41	Unidentified, perhaps an unidentified king	Brick pyramid	5.30 m	41
Beg. N 43	Unidentified king, perhaps King Amanikhedolo			
Beg. N 51	Unidentified king, perhaps King Yesebokheamani			21
Beg. N 53	Unidentified king, perhaps King Arnekhamani	Overbuilt by pyramids N5 and N6		
Beg. N 56	Unidentified, perhaps Prince Arikakahtani			

==== Treasures and artifacts of the North Cemetery ====
Numerous treasures were discovered in the pyramids since the 19th century.

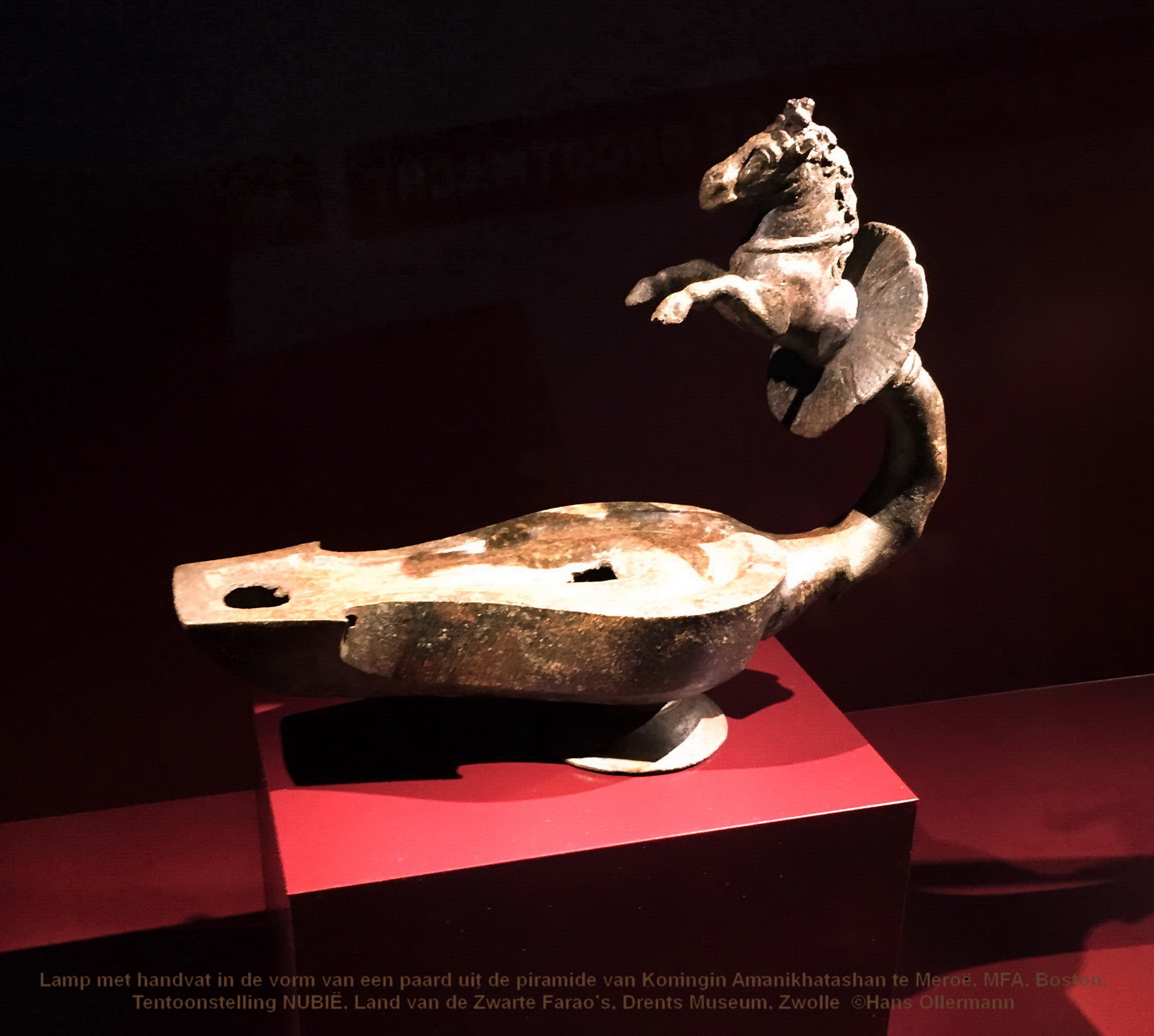
Lamp with handle in the shape of a horse, from the pyramid of Queen Amanikhatashan in Meroë (c. 62–c. 85 CE). Museum of Fine Arts, Boston

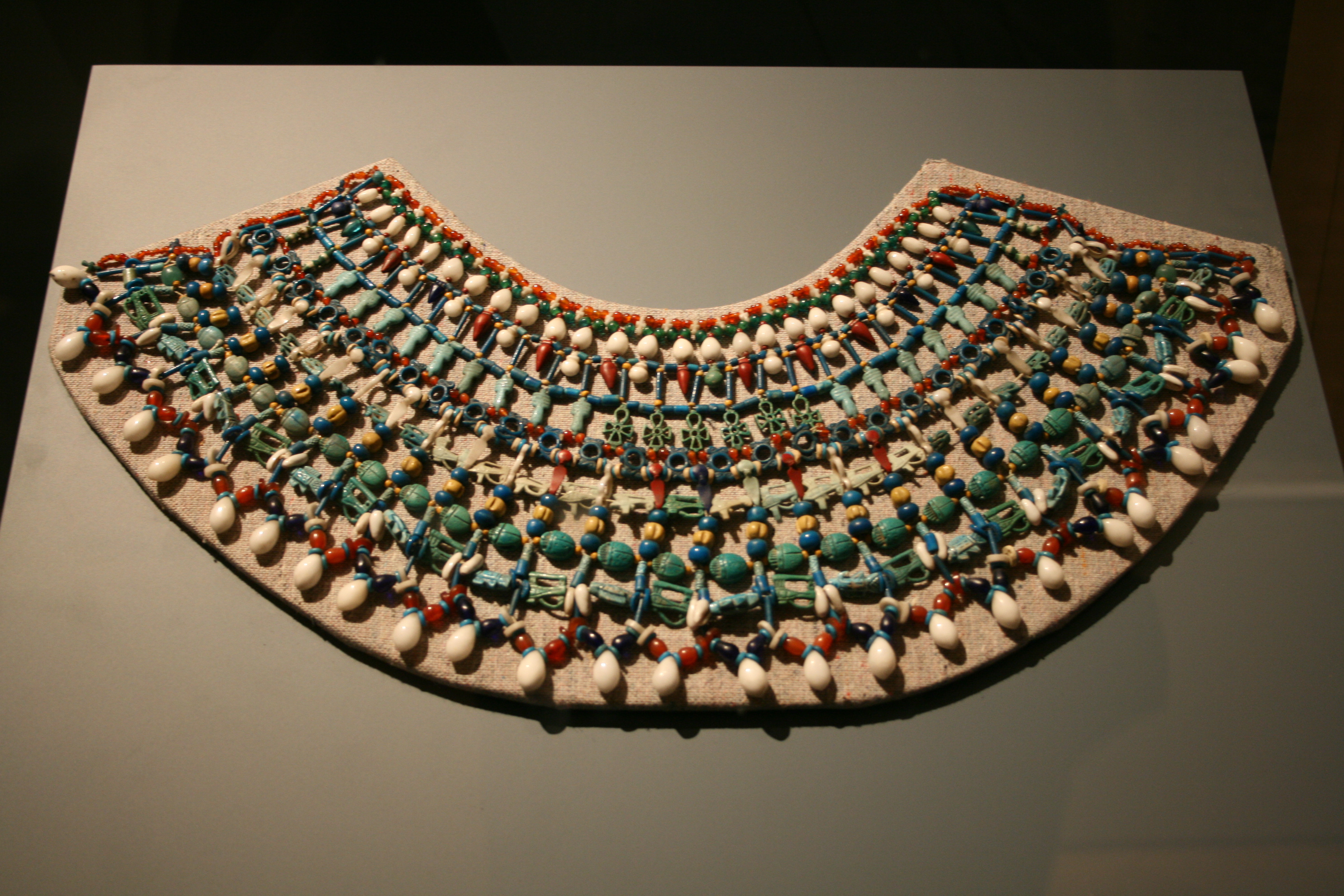
Usekh collar of queen Amanishakheto

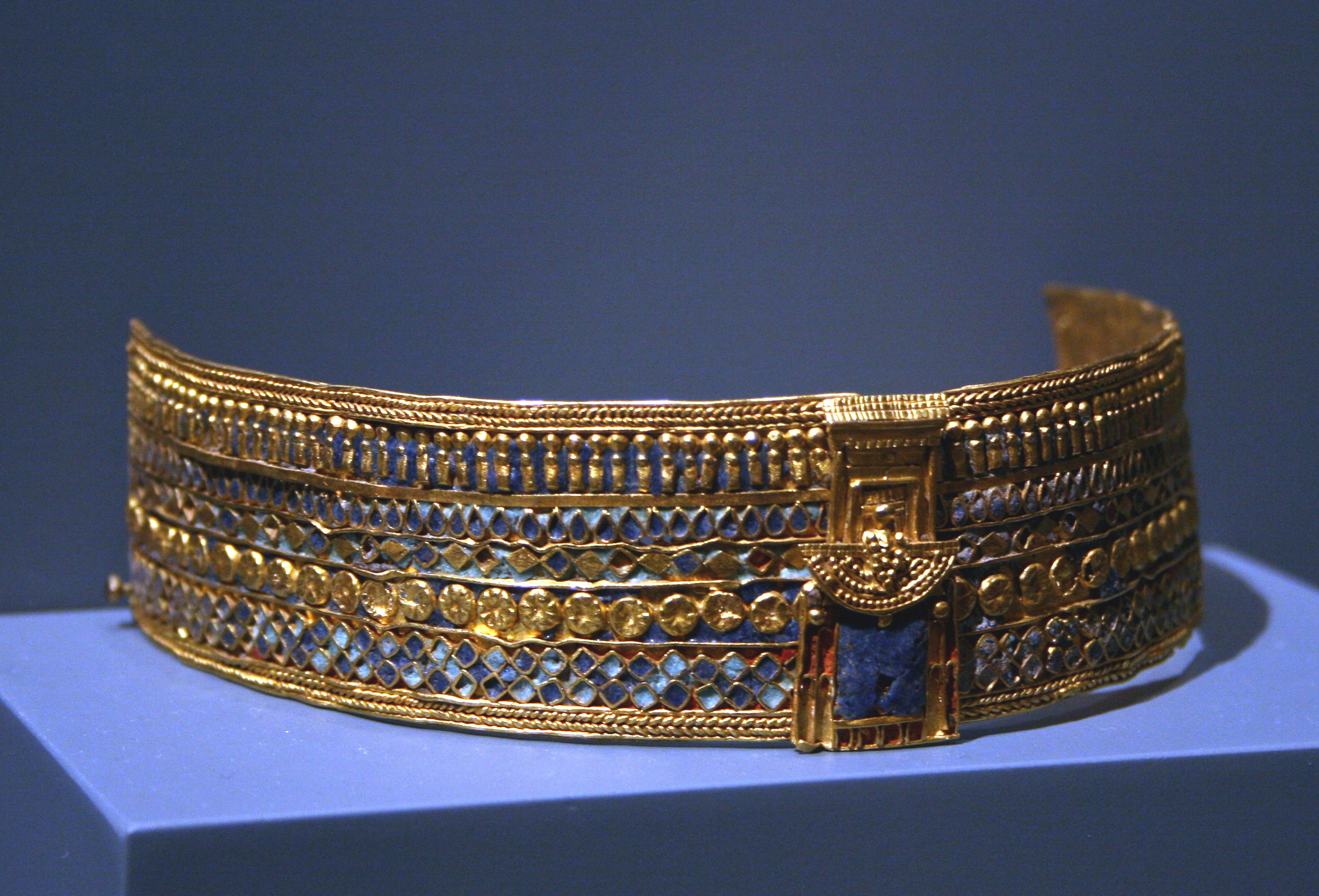
Bracelet from the tomb of Amanishakheto

Some of the treasures found by Ferlini in the pyramid of queen Amanishakheto

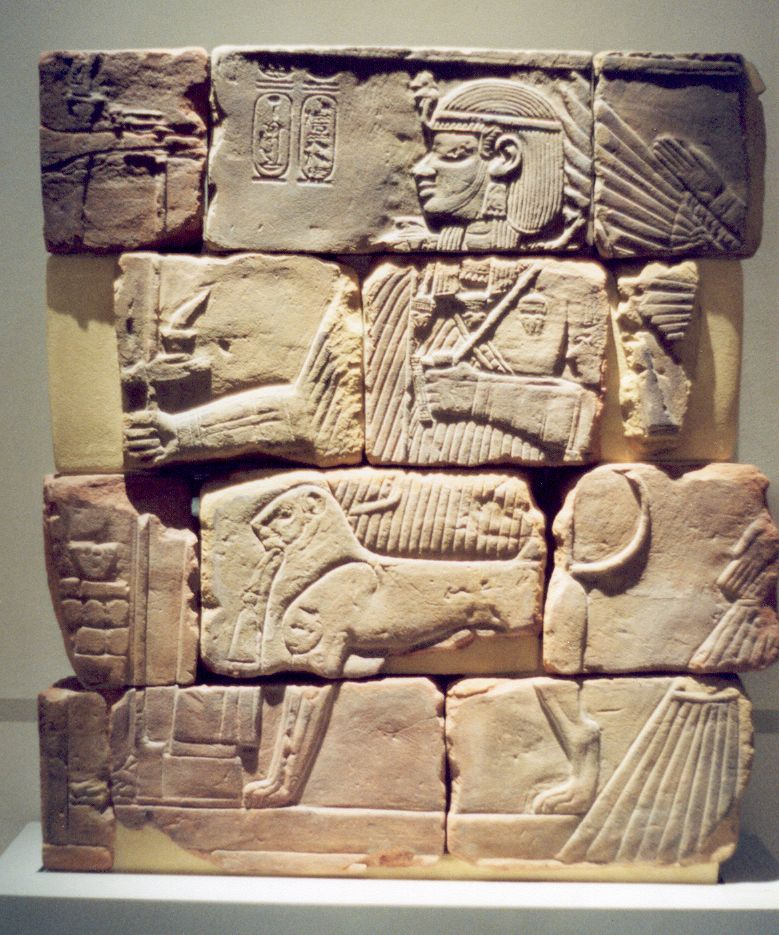
Wall of the Pyramid chapel of Amanitenmemide

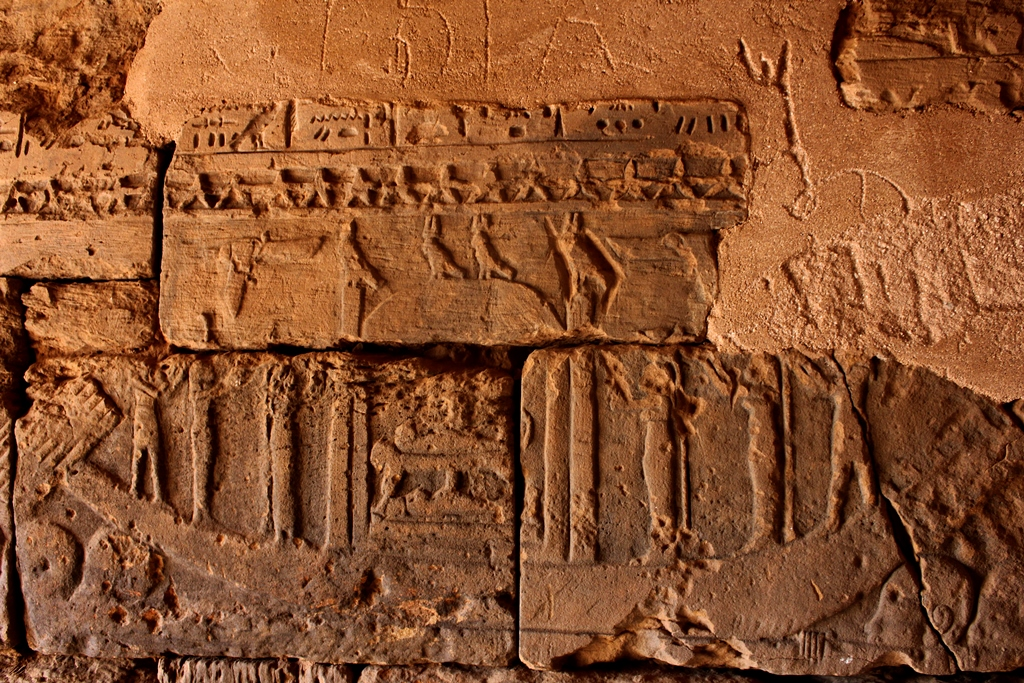
Detail of Pyramid Chapel Beg. N1

=== Western cemetery ===
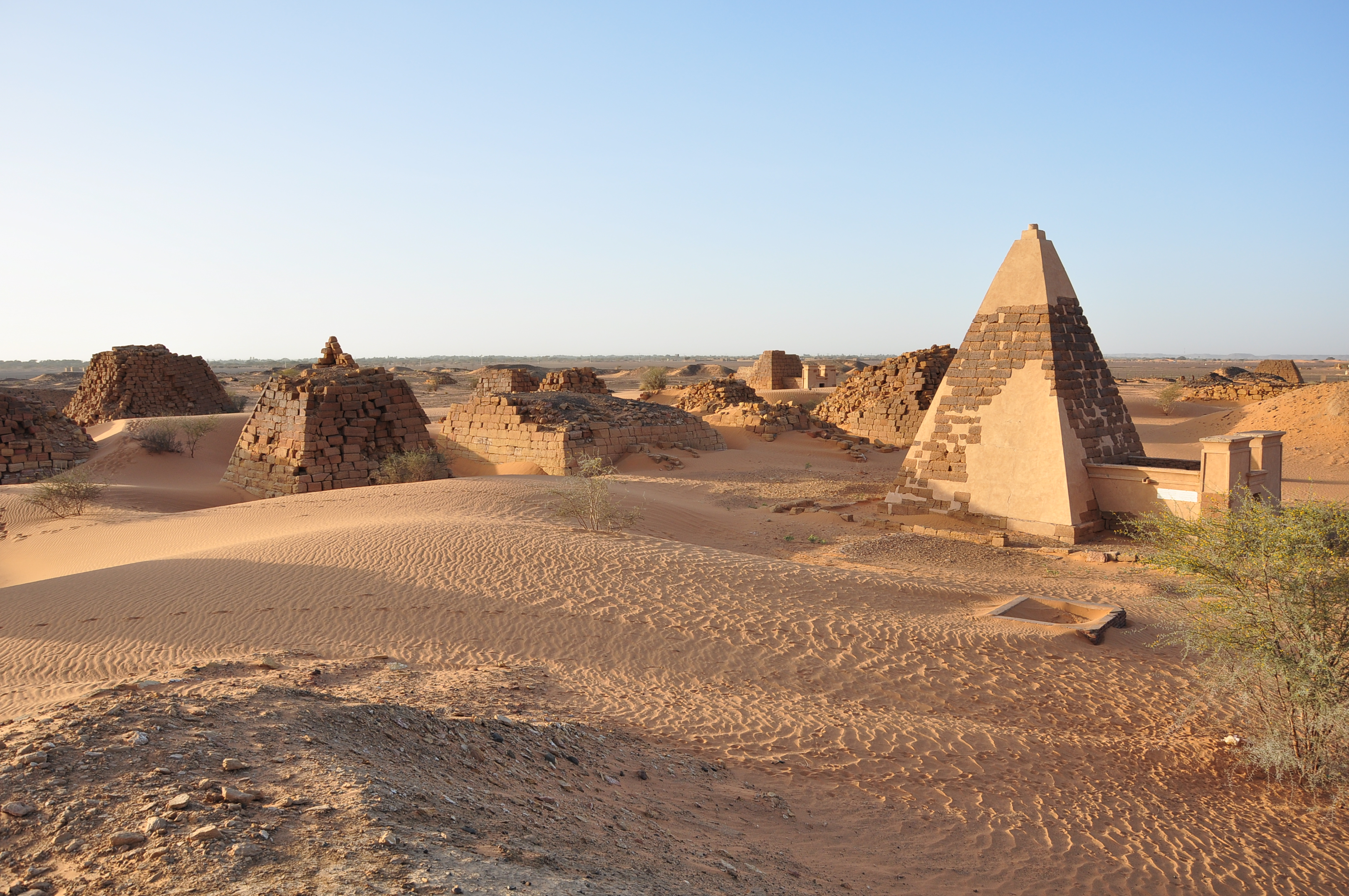
The West Cemetery at Meroë

The western cemetery saw the longest continuous use, with burials dating back to the 9th century BC. The western cemetery contains no burials of monarchs and was instead used by non-royal elites. There are over 800 graves in the western cemetery, out of which at least 82 were pyramids. High dignitaries and their family members appear to have been buried here.

Designation	Owner	Notes	Side length
Beg. W 14	Nasapanasap	Name found in chapel	
Beg. W 17	Sha...chadiliamani		10.65 m
Beg. W 18	Taktidamani		7.60 m
Beg. W 19	Prince Tedeqen	Name on stele and offering table	
Beg. W 105	Amanipilde		3.40 m
Beg. W 113	King Mashadeakhel (?)	Name on offering table; attribution uncertain	4.15 m
Beg. W 130	..k..	Royal offering table found	4.40 m
Beg. W 309	Queen Patrapeamani (?)	Attribution uncertain	6.60 m
Beg. W 342	Atedekey	Name on offering table	

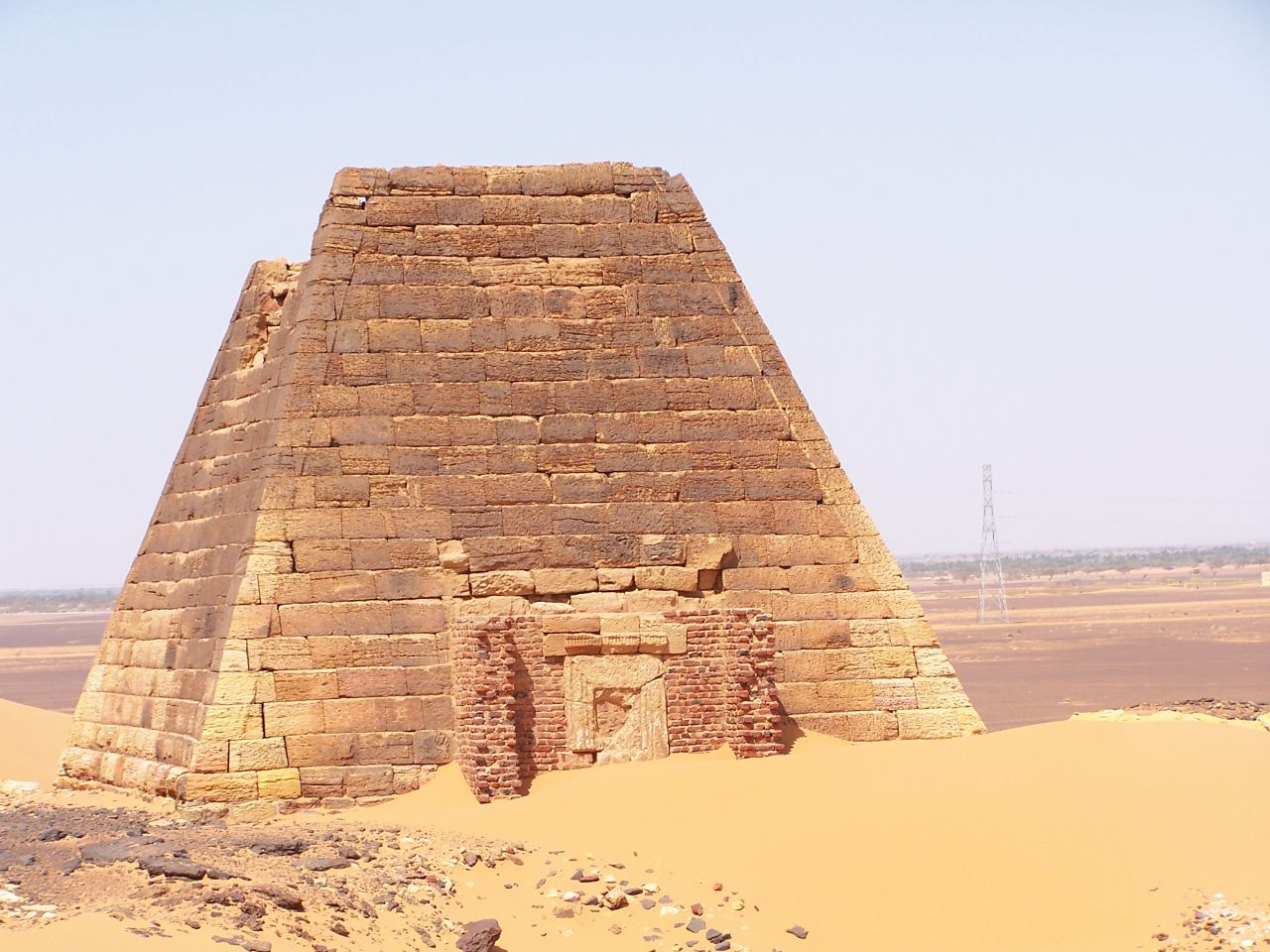
Pyramid N14

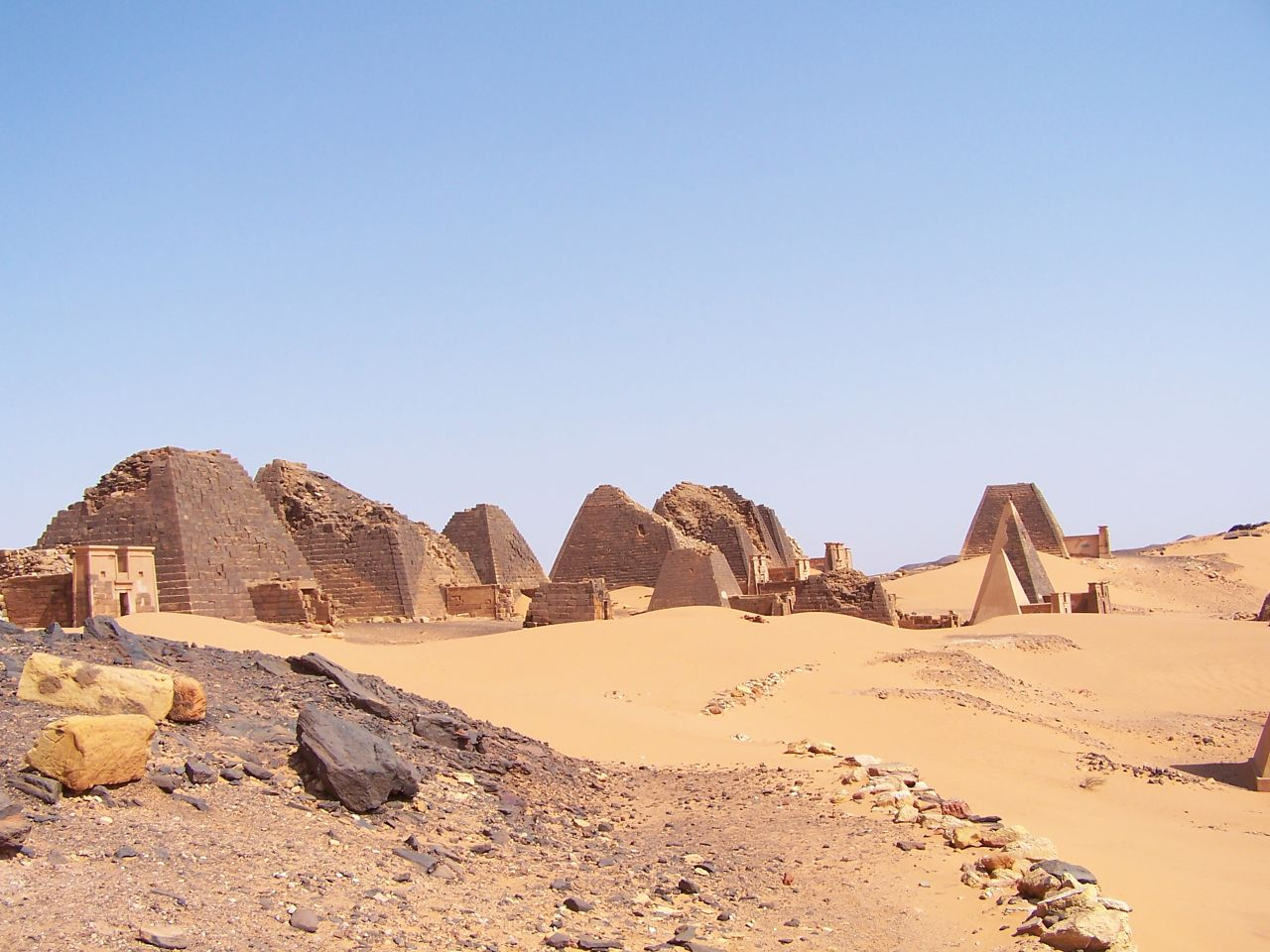
North Cemetery (2005)

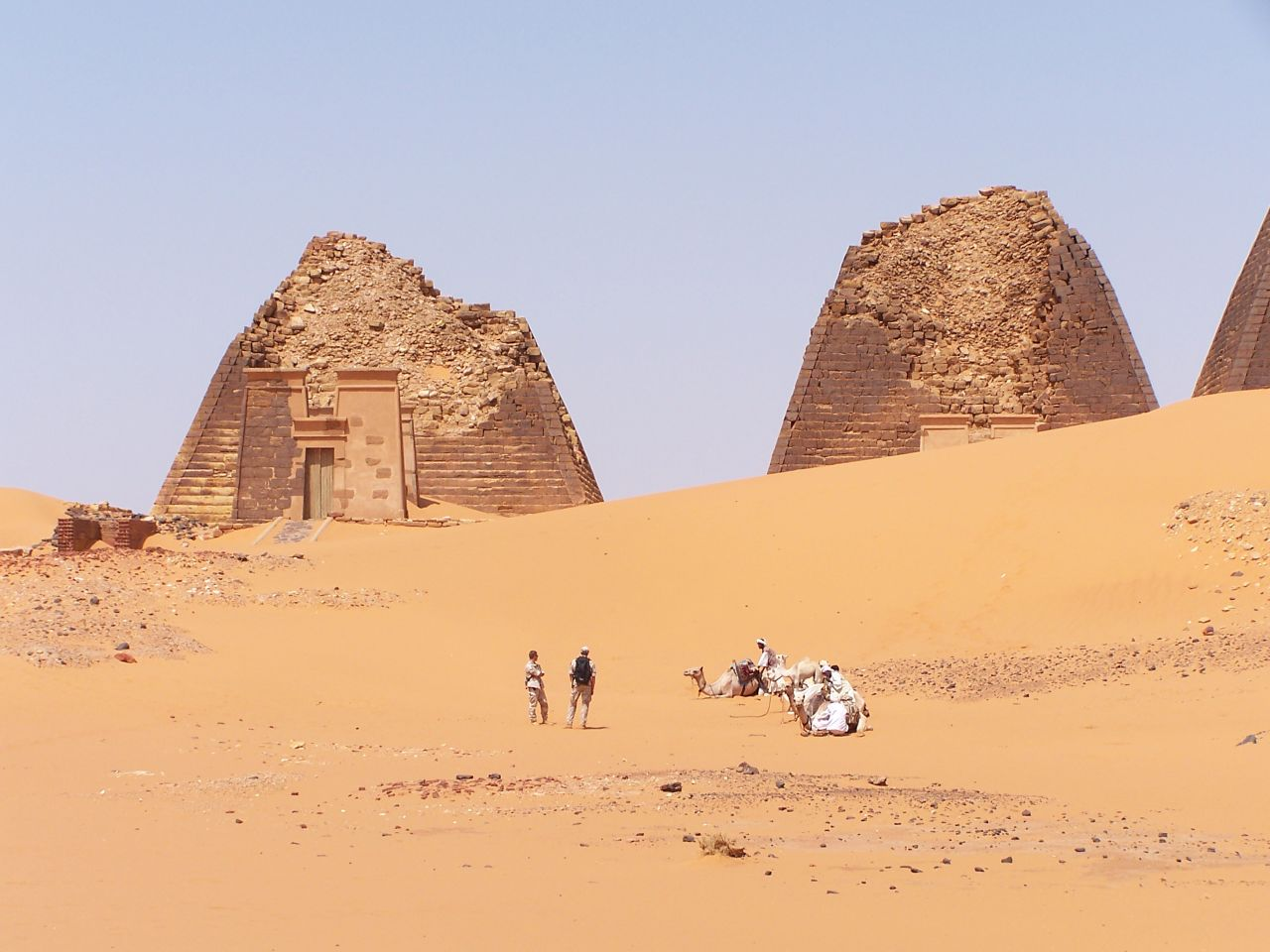
Pyramid N11 (left) and N12 (right)

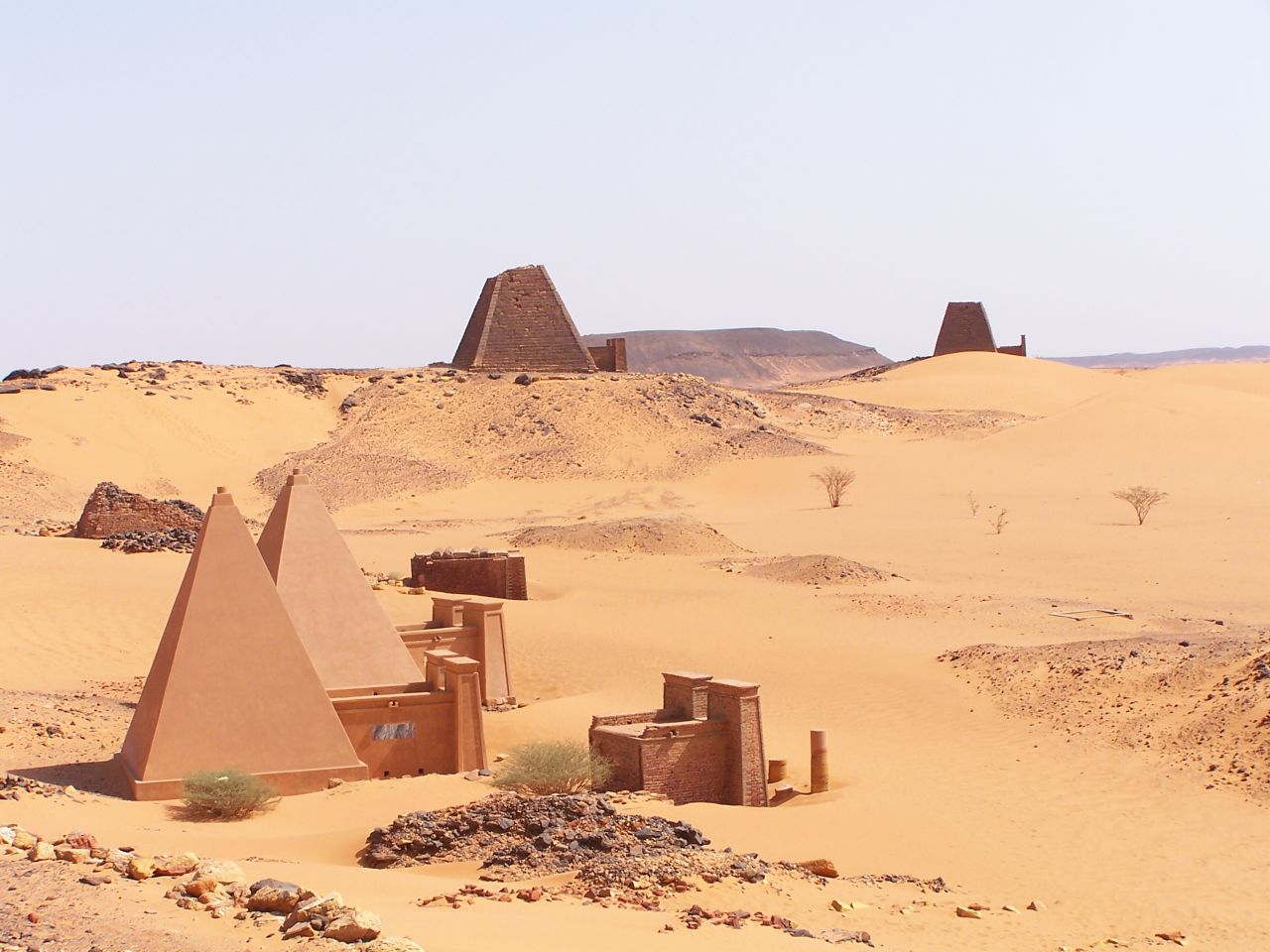
Pyramids N21 and N22 on the horizon, from left to right

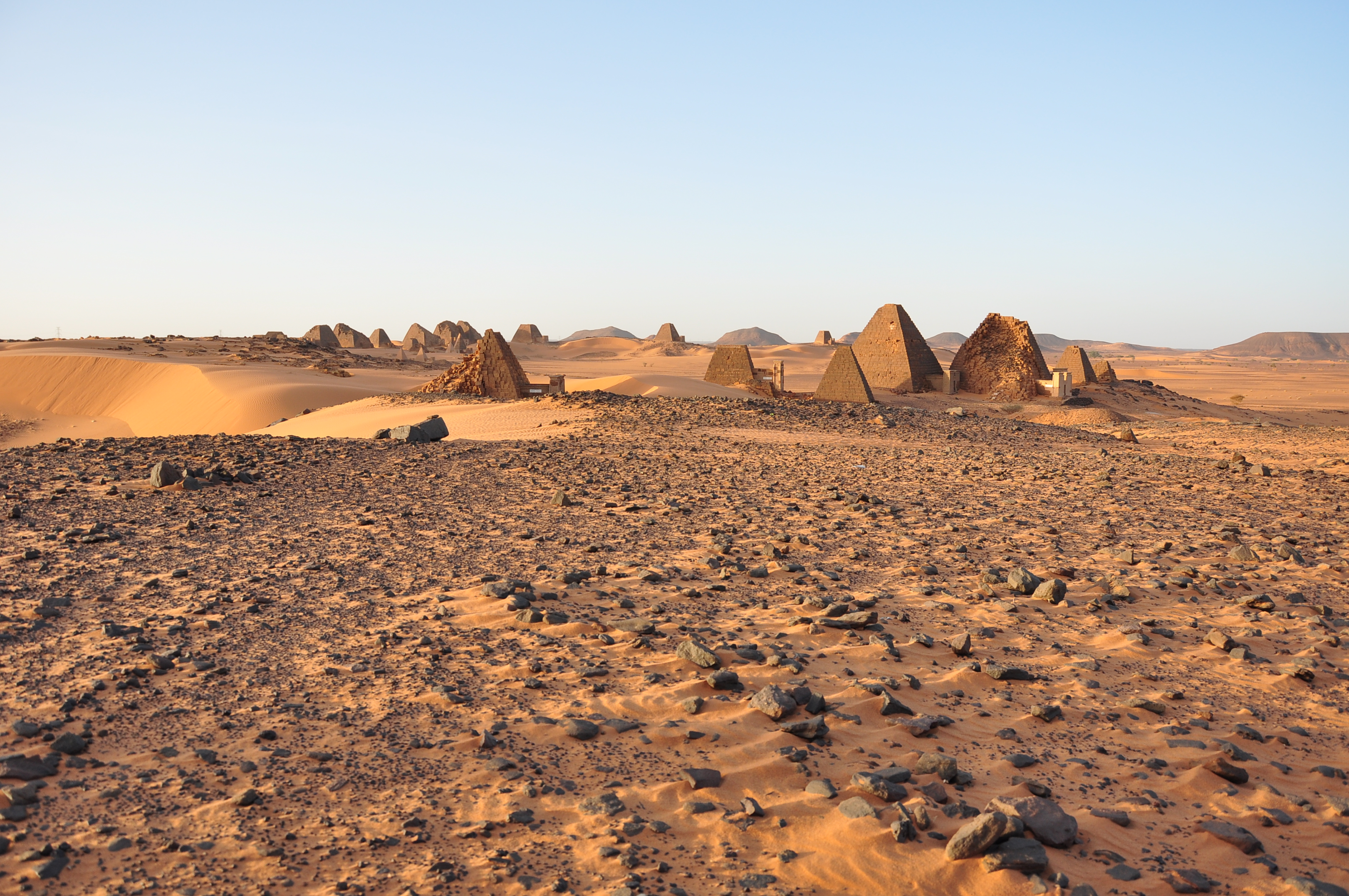
View of the pyramids of the South Cemetery, with the North Cemetery in the background

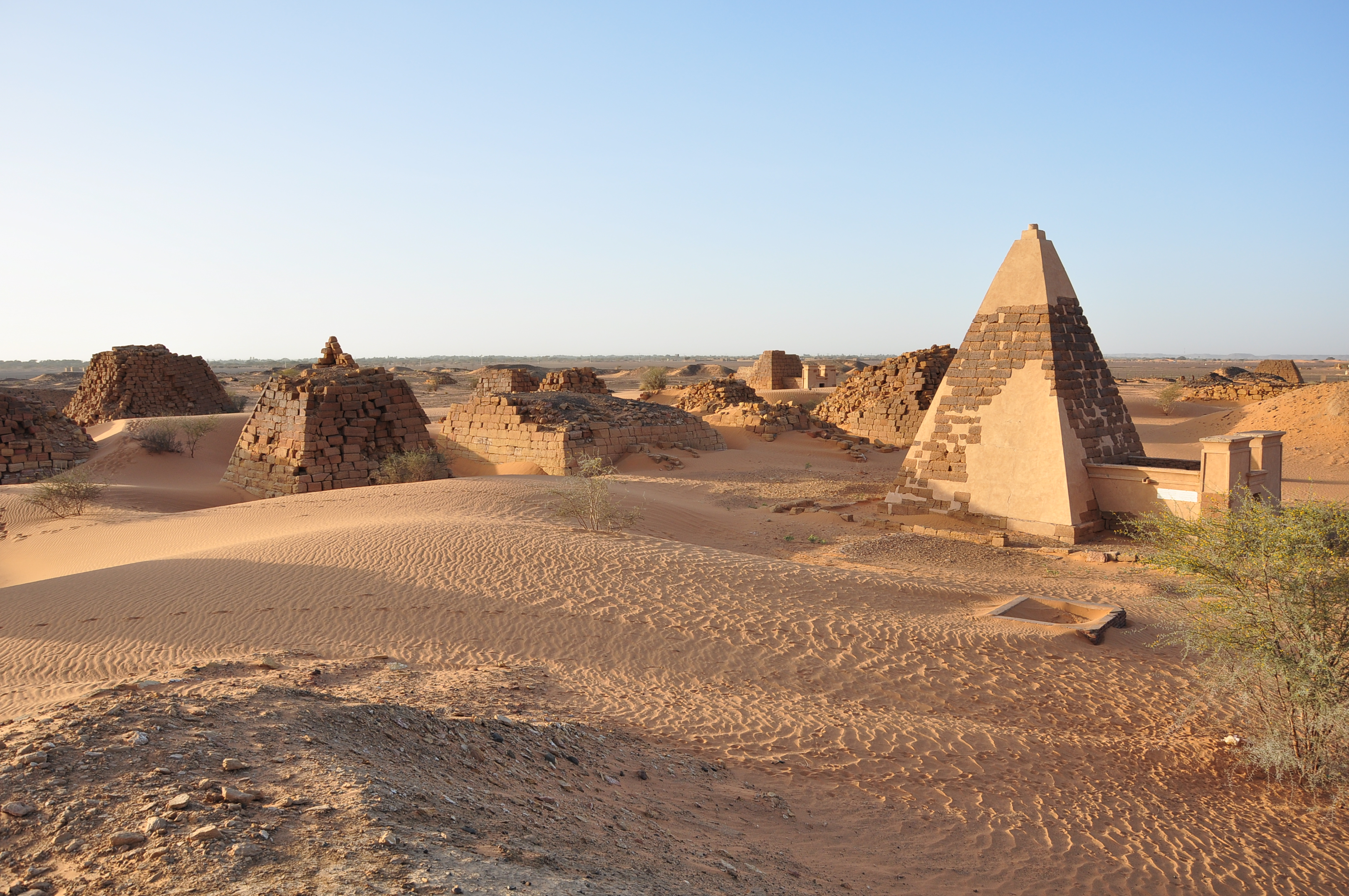
Pyramids of the West Cemetery – noble tombs

== See also ==
- List of monarchs of Kush
- El-Kurru pyramids
- Jebel Barkal pyramids
- Sedeinga pyramids
- List of pyramids
