= Mernua =

Nubian queen

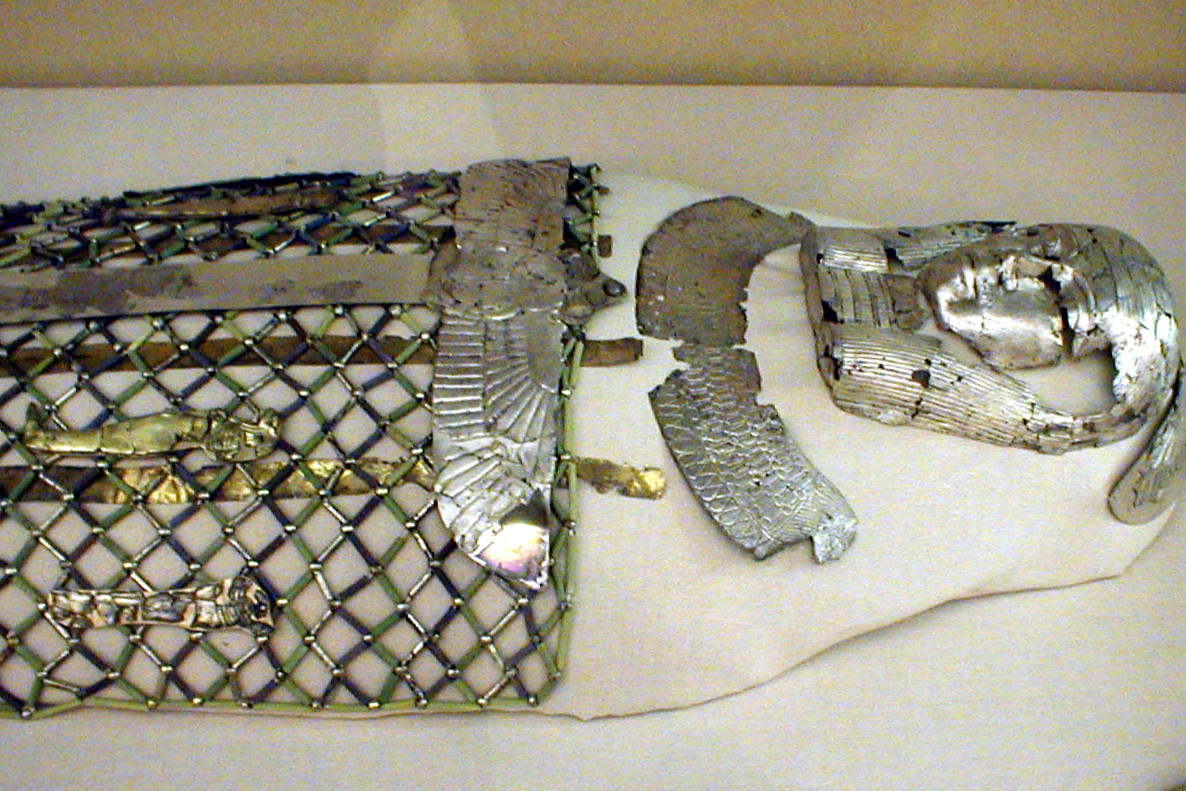
Mummy coverings of Mernua

Mernua was a Nubian queen known solely for her burial at Meroe. Her burial, found intact, still contained the remains of three wooden coffins and mummy coverings in silver, including a mummy mask that was also made in silver. Her name and title are only preserved on the shabtis and mummy covering that was found. On the mummy covering, she is called king's wife. No king's name is preserved in the burial. Her royal husband can only be guessed by the style and dating of the funerary equipment. She seems to date around 600 BC. Anlamani or Aspelta are potential partners.
