= List of pyramids in Ireland =

This listing article does not include "climbing pyramids" typically found in playgrounds.

List of pyramids in Ireland by location

Name	Location	County	Height (feet)	Height (metres)	Completed	Comment	Image
Pyramid in the Neale	Neale	Mayo	30	9.2	1760	Folly	
Howard Mausoleum	Kilbride, Arklow	Wicklow	30	9.2	1785	Resting place for the deceased	
Kinnitty Pyramid	Kinnitty	Offaly	30	9.2	1834	Resting place for the deceased	
Garvagh Pyramid	Garvagh	Londonderry	18	~5.5	1800s	Resting place for the deceased	
The Pyramid of Dublin	Killiney Hill	Dublin	~13	~4	1884	Folly	
The Pyramids	Sneem	Kerry	various	various	~2000	Modern construction	
Barker Family Pyramid Monument	Kilcooley Estate	Tipperary	20	6	Not available	Resting place for the deceased	
Swifte Family Pyramid	Castlerickard, near Longwood	Meath	20	6	Not available	Resting place for the deceased	
Pyramid in Merrion Square	Merrion Square, Dublin City	Dublin	20	6	2008	Armed Forces memorial	
Boora Pyramid	Lough Boora Discovery Park near Blueball	Offaly	20	6	~2005	Sculpture Art Work	
