= 560s BC =

Decade

This article concerns the period 569 BC – 560 BC.

== Events and trends ==
- 569 BC—The 24th Jain Tirthankara, Mahavira, takes Diksha.
- 568 BC—Amtalqa succeeds his brother Aspelta as king of Kush.
- 567 BC—Former pharaoh Apries invades Egypt with Babylonian help but is defeated by Saite pharaoh Amasis II (also known as Ahmose II).
- 25 May, 567 BC—Servius Tullius, king of Rome, celebrates a triumph for his victory over the Etruscans.
- 566 BC—The first known Panathenaic Games of Ancient Greece are held in Athens.
- 562 BC—Amel-Marduk succeeds Nebuchadnezzar II as king of Babylon.
- 561 BC—All eight planets of the Solar System as well as the dwarf planet Pluto fall into planetary alignment.
- 561 BC/560 BC—Croesus becomes king of Lydia (?)
- 560 BC—Neriglissar succeeds Amel-Marduk as king of Babylon.
- 560 BC—An aristocrat named Pisistratus seizes the Acropolis of Athens and declares himself tyrant. He is deposed in the same year.
- c. 560 BC—The statue known as The Calf Bearer (Moschophoros), from the Acropolis, Athens, is completed.

== Significant people ==
- 564 BC—Death of Aesop, Greek fable-teller
- April 563 BC—Birth of Siddhartha Gautama, later known as Gautama Buddha, in Lumbini, Nepal
- 563 BC—Death of Queen Maya, mother of Siddhartha Gautama
- 562 BC—Death of Nebuchadnezzar, king of the Neo-Babylonian Empire
- 561 BC—Death of Jehoiachin, the nineteenth king of Judah who reigned for 3 months.
- 560 BC—Death of King Gong of Chu, Chinese king of Chu
