= Akheqa =

Nubian queen

Akheqa was a Nubian queen with the Egyptian titles king's wife and king's sister. Her royal husband is not known for sure. Perhaps she was the daughter of Aspelta and wife of Aramatle-qo, as proposed by Dows Dunham and M. F. Laming Macadam.

Akheqa is only known from her burial at Nuri (Nu. 38). Her burial consisted of a pyramid with a small chapel in front of it, and a staircase going down to the two burial chambers that were found looted. The burial still contained fragments of at least 170 shabti figures of the queen, providing her name and titles. These were almost identical to the shabtis of queen Madiqen suggesting they may have been made in the same workshop. There were also found shabtis of queen Nasalsa, queen Madiqen and Artaha.
