= Shrine of Taharqa =

Egyptian shrine

Coordinates: 51.75525°N 1.26064°W

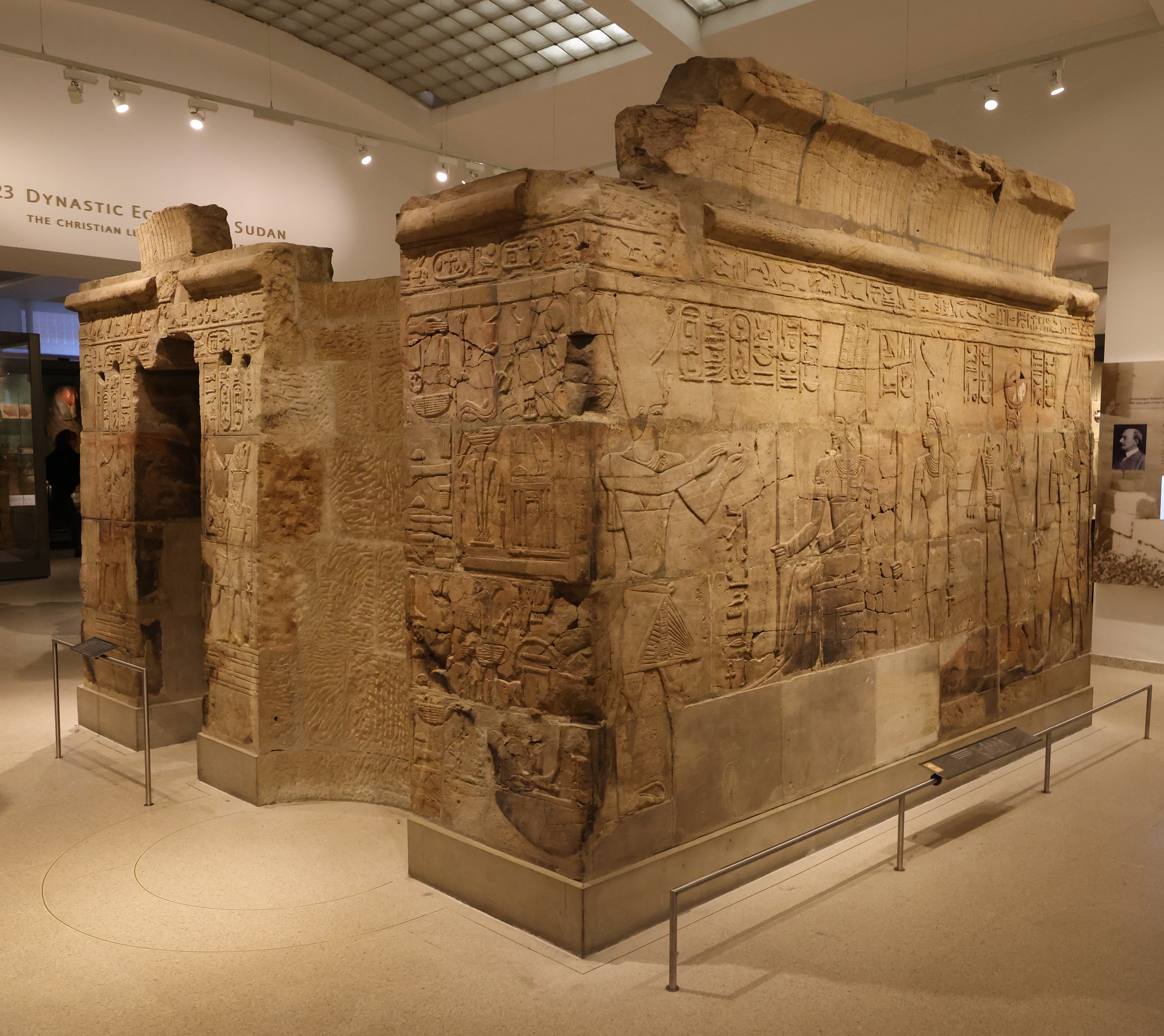
The Shrine of Taharqa in the Ashmolean museum viewed from the south east corner

The Shrine of Taharqa is an Egyptian shrine commissioned by the pharaoh Taharqa in the early part of the 7th century BC. It was located in Kawa, which falls within the borders of present day Sudan, but since 1936 has been kept in the Ashmolean Museum in Oxford, England.

== Description ==
The shrine was originally built within a large temple dedicated to Amun-Re. It appears to have been constructed at the same time as the rest of the temple.

The shrine has four outer walls engraved with images of Taharqa interacting with various gods. On two of them he is depicted with Amun-Re along with the gods of Gematen on the western side and Thebes on the eastern side. The depiction of Amun-Re on the western side was painted blue, as was typical of the period, whereas the depiction on the eastern side was not. The southern side depicts gods associated with Heliopolis while the northern side carries depictions of gods associated with Memphis. The shrine is 2.3 meters tall and about 4 meters by 4 meters.

== History ==
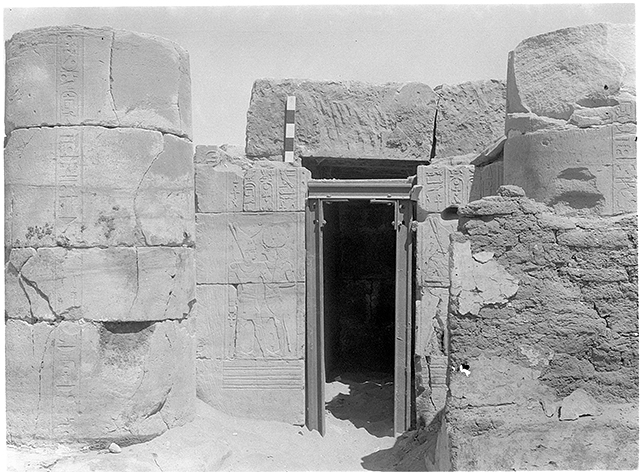
The Shrine in situ at Kawa

The shrine was built in or shortly after 684 BC under the rule of the pharaoh Taharqa. A neighbouring shrine was added in the 6th century BC under the rule of the pharaoh Aspelta.

Westerners became aware of the broader temple site in the late 19th century. Small digs were carried out in 1929 and 1930 and an extensive excavation began 22 November 1930. These digs exposed the remains of the buildings to the weather and they started to decay.

The carved walls of the shrine along with the Wall of Aspelta were removed from the site in 1936 with the permission of the Sudanese government while other carvings were transferred to Khartoum with the aim of protecting them from further decay. The blocks were removed by building sand ramps up the side of the shrine and then moving them to the ground on rollers. They were then coated in a solution of nitrocellulose in amyl acetate and acetone, as a lacquer to help preserve the blocks' surface integrity, before being transported to the Ashmolean Museum in 233 cases. This process took about a month to complete.

=== At the Ashmolean ===
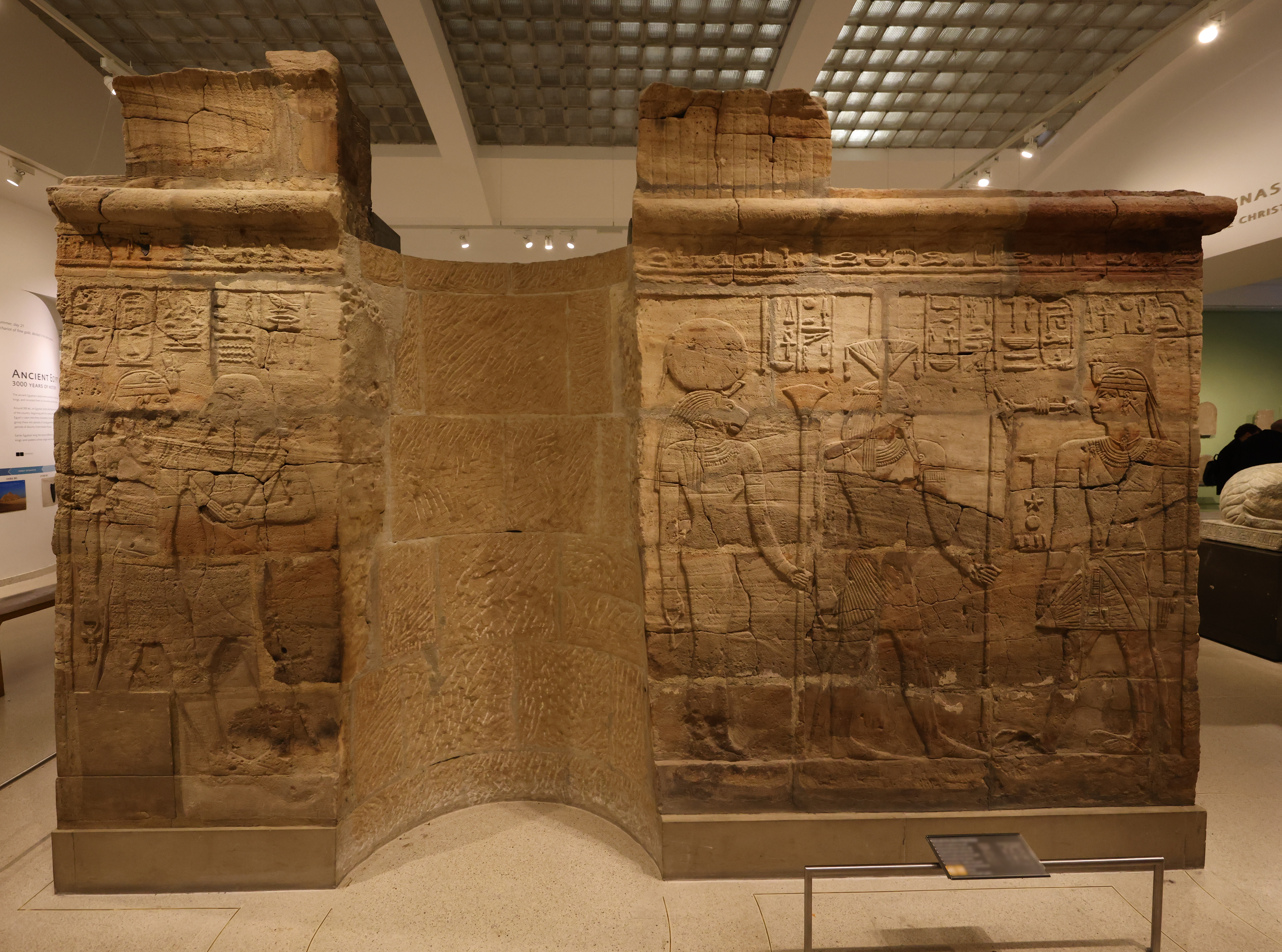
The north wall of the shrine

Once at the Ashmolean a further layer of nitrocellulose was applied to the stones. A brick structure was built to cover the interior faces of the shrine. It was then plastered with the plaster being coated with black paint. The shrine was protected from rising damp by a layer of bitumen.

By the 1960s the nitrocellulose had started to decay and in 1968 it was removed from most of the shrine and replaced with a layer of paraffin wax. The remaining nitrocellulose was removed in the 1980s with the paint being stabilised with Paraloid B-72. Prior to the 2000s rebuilding work the interior of the shine was used for storage by the museum.

Due to the shrine's weight, it was not moved when the gallery housing it was rebuilt and, since November 2011, the shrine has been on display to the public in the museum's refurbished Egyptian and Nubian galleries. It is displayed with a sculpture of Taharqa loaned by the Southampton museum service visible inside.
