= Meqemale =

Nubian queen

Meqemale (Makmalē) was a Nubian queen, so far only known from her burial in the royal cemetery of Nuri (Nuri 40). She was perhaps the wife of king Aspelta, but this is only a guess. Her only known title is big king's wife, Hmt-niswt aAt. (not great king's wife as usually). Her burial consisted of a pyramid with a chapel and the underground burial rooms. There was a staircase going underground and leading to the two burial chambers. The burial was found robbed, but fragments of at least 108 shabtis were found. They bear the name and the title of the queen. Several vessels and an offering table were found too. A shabti with the name of the queen was also found at Sanam.
