= 562 BC =

562 BC in various calendars
- Gregorian calendar: 562 BC; DLXII BC
- Ab urbe condita: 192
- Ancient Egypt era: XXVI dynasty, 103
- Pharaoh: Amasis II, 9
- Ancient Greek Olympiad (summer): 54th Olympiad, year 3
- Assyrian calendar: 4189
- Balinese saka calendar: N/A
- Bengali calendar: −1155 – −1154
- Berber calendar: 389
- Buddhist calendar: −17
- Burmese calendar: −1199
- Byzantine calendar: 4947–4948
- Chinese calendar: 戊戌年 (Earth Dog); 2136 or 1929 — to — 己亥年 (Earth Pig); 2137 or 1930
- Coptic calendar: −845 – −844
- Discordian calendar: 605
- Ethiopian calendar: −569 – −568
- Hebrew calendar: 3199–3200
- Hindu calendars
- Vikram Samvat: −505 – −504
- Shaka Samvat: N/A
- Kali Yuga: 2539–2540
- Holocene calendar: 9439
- Iranian calendar: 1183 BP – 1182 BP
- Islamic calendar: 1219 BH – 1218 BH
- Javanese calendar: N/A
- Julian calendar: N/A
- Korean calendar: 1772
- Minguo calendar: 2473 before ROC 民前2473年
- Nanakshahi calendar: −2029
- Thai solar calendar: −19 – −18
- Tibetan calendar: ས་ཕོ་ཁྱི་ལོ་ (male Earth-Dog) −435 or −816 or −1588 — to — ས་མོ་ཕག་ལོ་ (female Earth-Boar) −434 or −815 or −1587

The year 562 BC was a year of the pre-Julian Roman calendar. In the Roman Empire, it was known as year 192 Ab urbe condita. The denomination 562 BC for this year has been used since the early medieval period, when the Anno Domini calendar era became the prevalent method in Europe for naming years.

== Events ==
- Amel-Marduk succeeds Nebuchadnezzar II as king of Babylon.

== Deaths ==
- Nebuchadnezzar II, emperor of the Neo-Babylonian Empire.
