= Maletasen =

Nubian queen

< Aa15 r nfr ti rw z n y >
Maletasen
in hieroglyphs
Era: Kingdom of Kush
(780 BC–350 AD)

Maletasen was a Nubian queen, so far only known from her burial in the royal cemetery of Nuri (Nuri 39). She was perhaps the wife of king Aramatle-qo. Her only known title is big king's wife. (not great king's wife as usually). Her burial consisted of a pyramid with a chapel and the underground burial rooms. There was a staircase going underground and leading to the two burial chambers. The burial was found robbed, but fragments of at least 123 shabtis were found. They bear the name and the title of the queen.
