= Kawa, Sudan =

Archaeological site in Sudan

Coordinates: 19°07′N 30°29.48′E

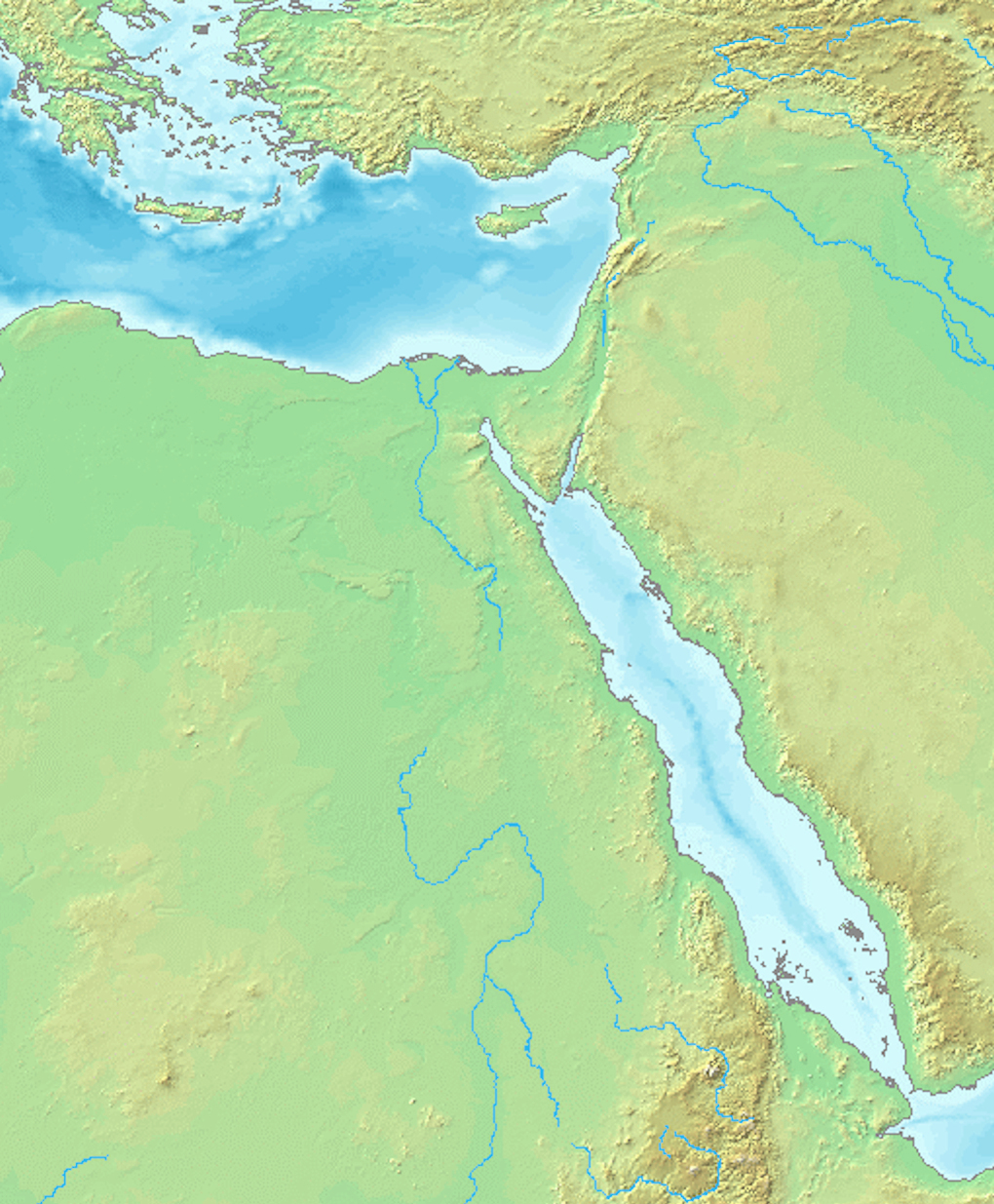
Location of Kawa

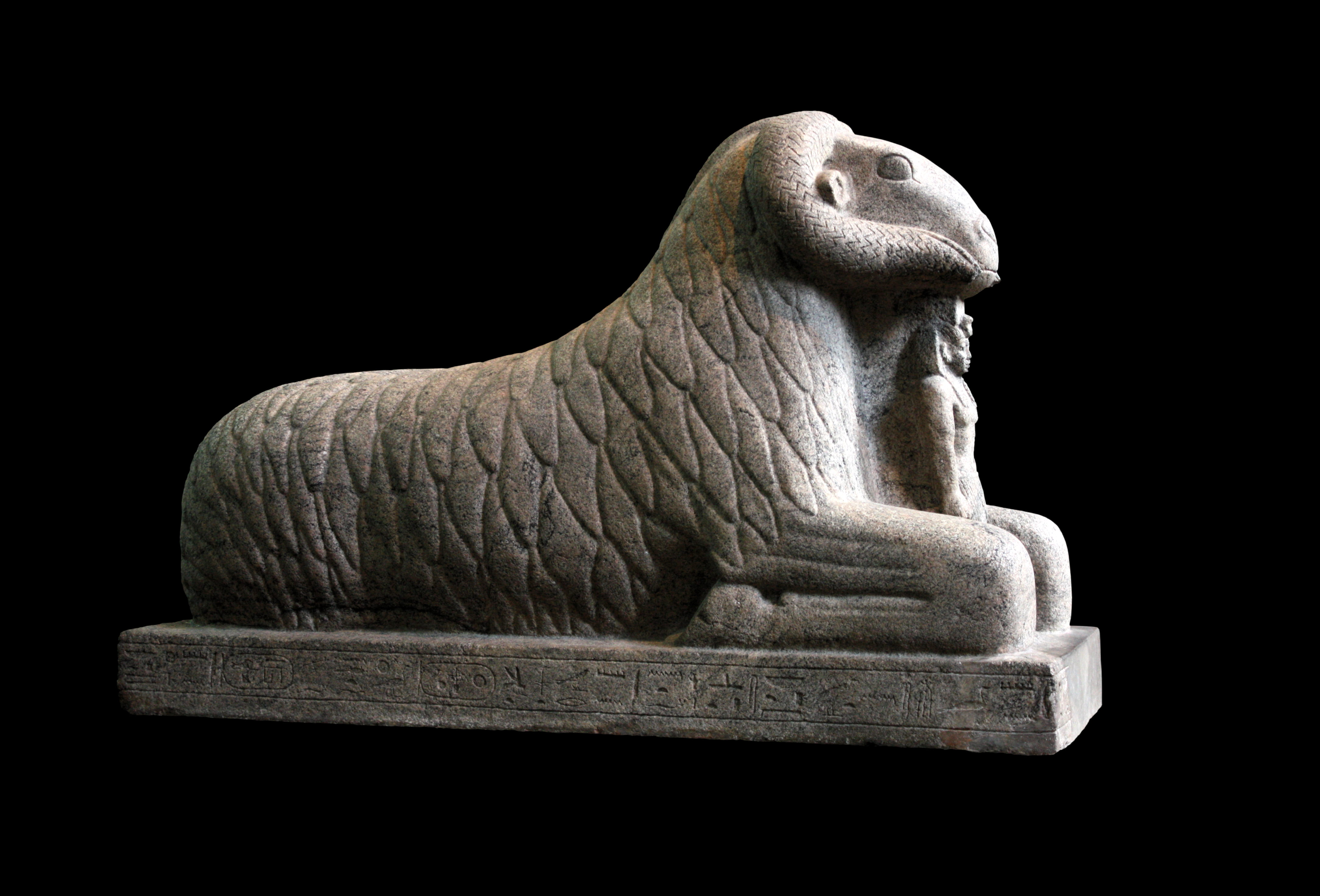
Granite ram of Amun with King Taharqa. Twenty-Fifth Dynasty, from Kawa. On display at the British Museum.

Kawa, known as Gematon ("Aten is perceived") in ancient Egyptian texts and as Patigga or Patinga during Greco-Roman times, is a town and archaeological site in Sudan, located between the third and fourth cataracts of the Nile on the east bank of the river, across from Dongola. In ancient times it was the site of several temples to the Egyptian god Amun, built by the pharaohs Amenhotep III, Akhenaten, Tutankhamun, and by Taharqa and other kings of Kush.

Westerners became aware of the site in the late 19th century. Small digs were carried out in 1929 and 1930 and an extensive excavation began 22 November 1930. A new era of exploration at the site began in 1997.

== Shrine of Taharqa ==
A temple of Amun-Re commissioned by Taharqa once existed at Kawa. A small shrine from within that temple, known as the Shrine of Taharqa, is in the Ashmolean Museum.

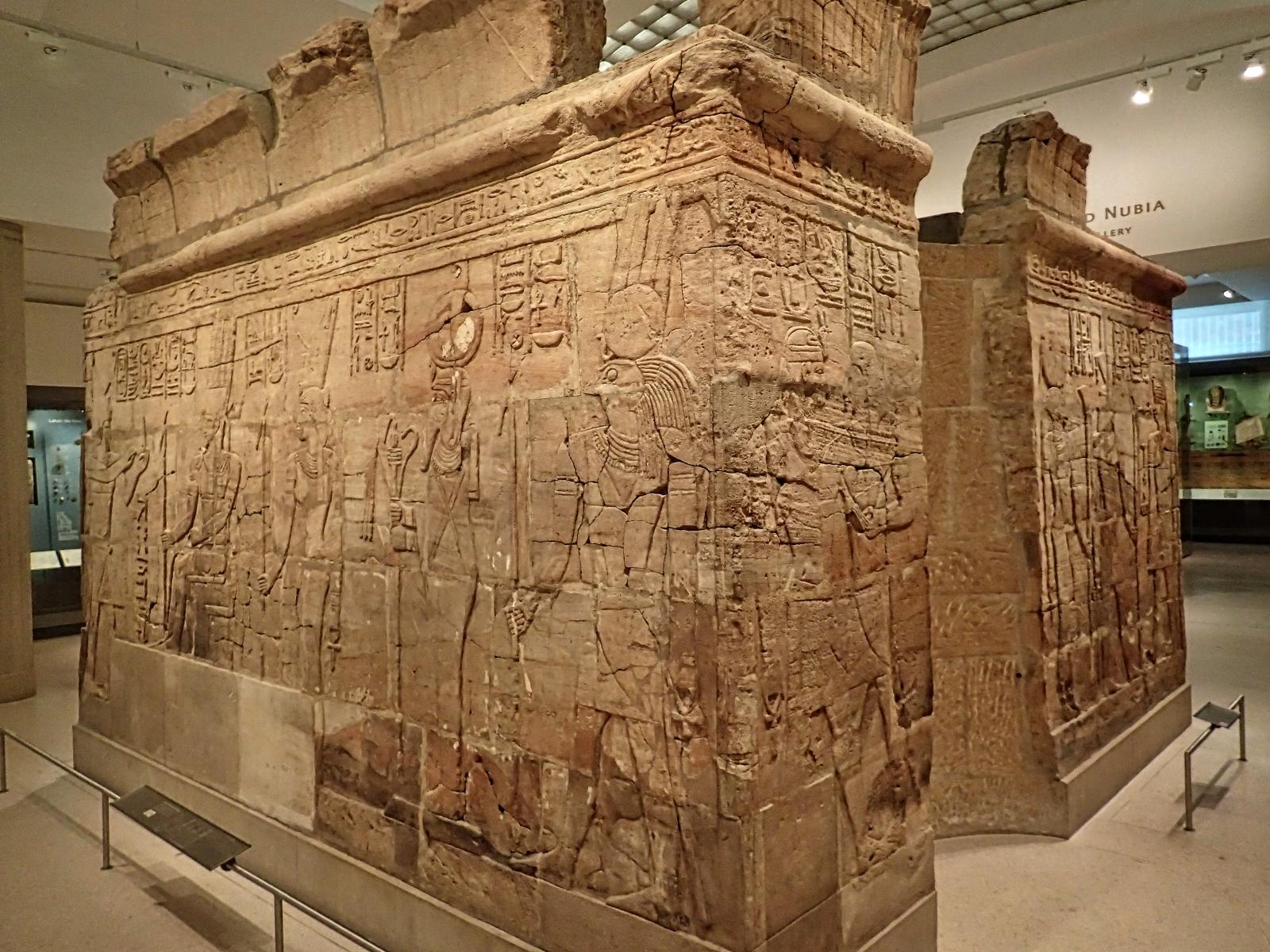
The Shrine of Taharqa, Ashmolean Museum

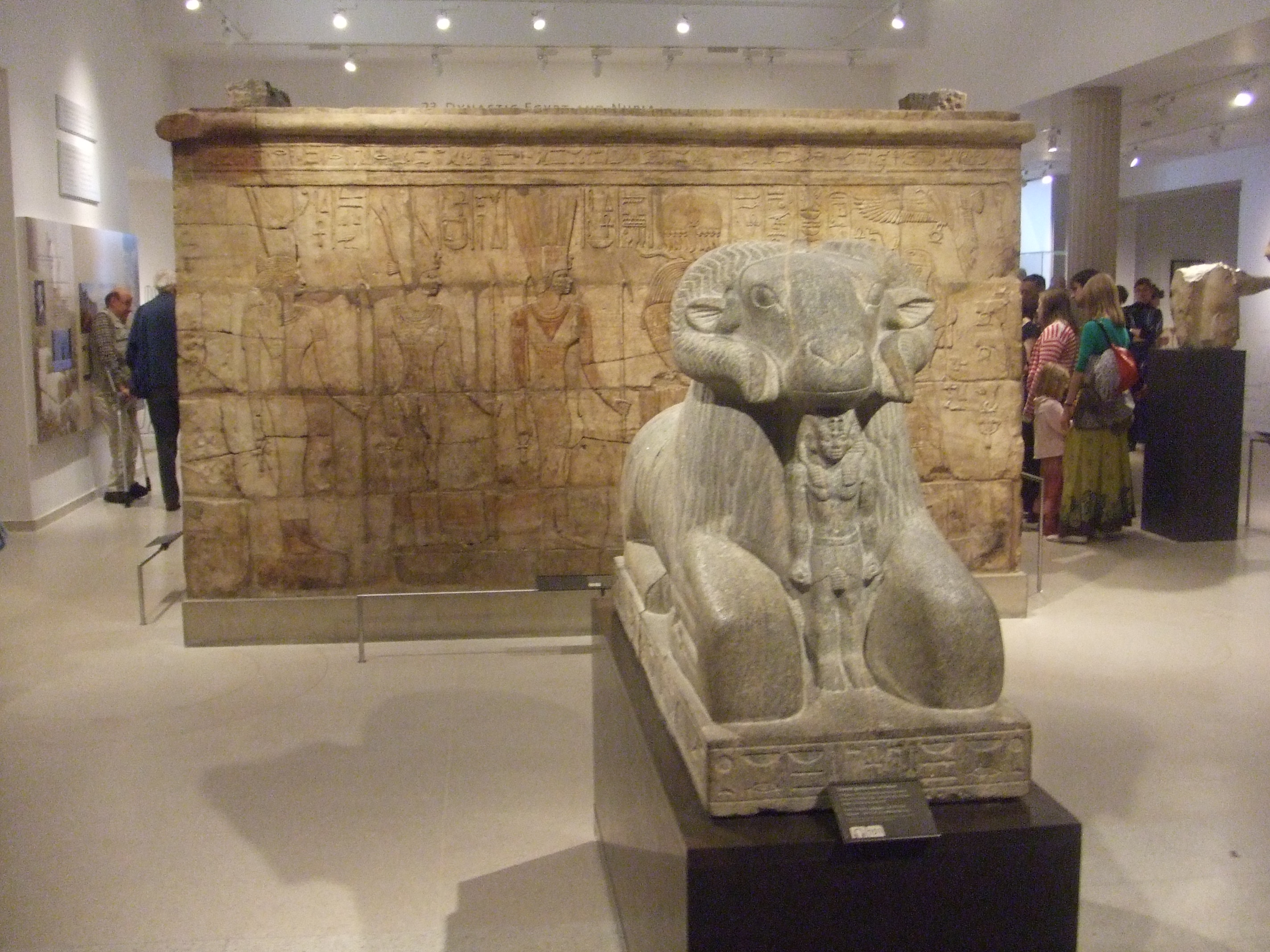
Shrine and Sphinx of Taharqa. Taharqa appears between the legs of the Ram-Sphinx

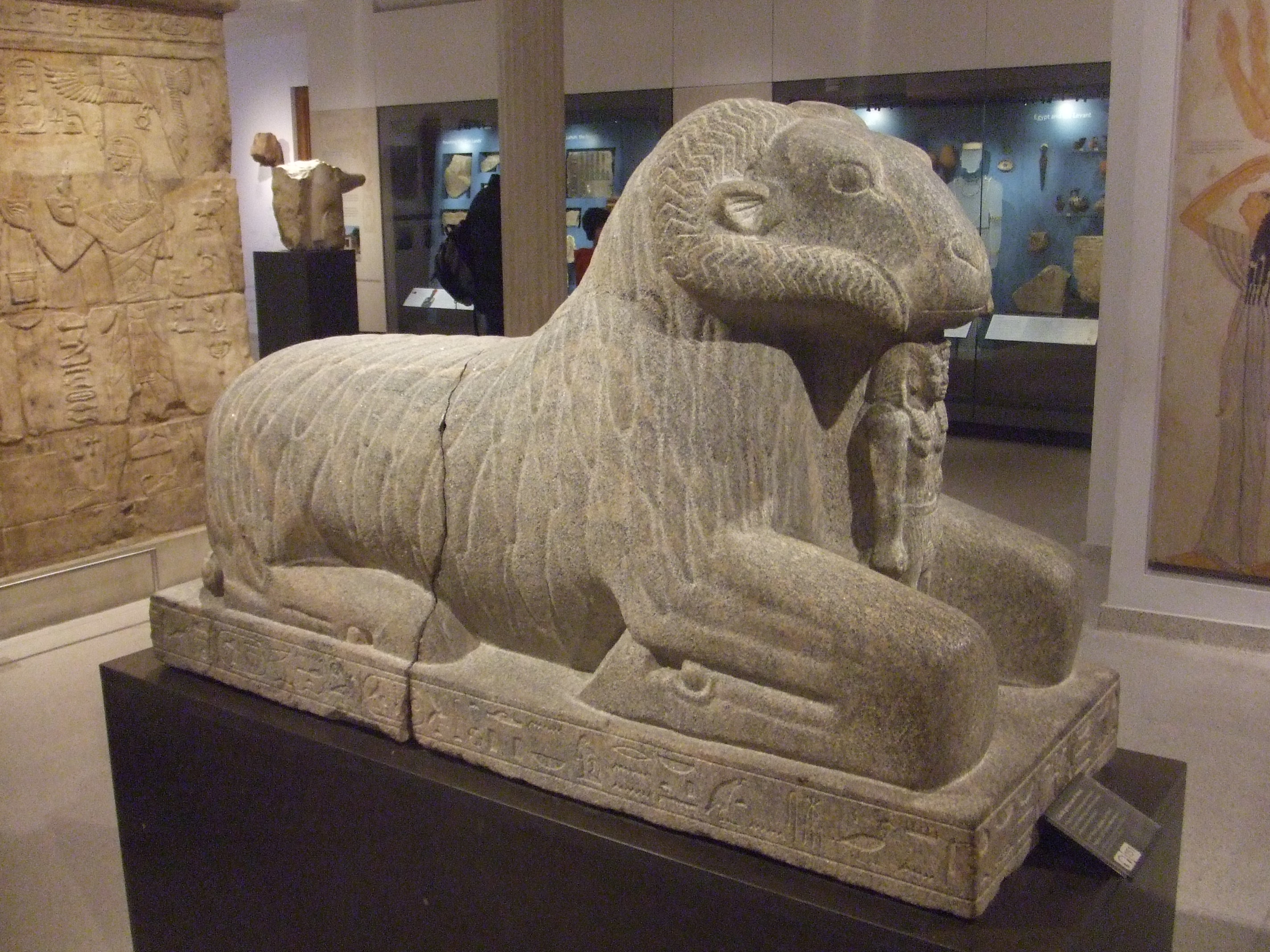
The Ram-Sphinx and Taharqa

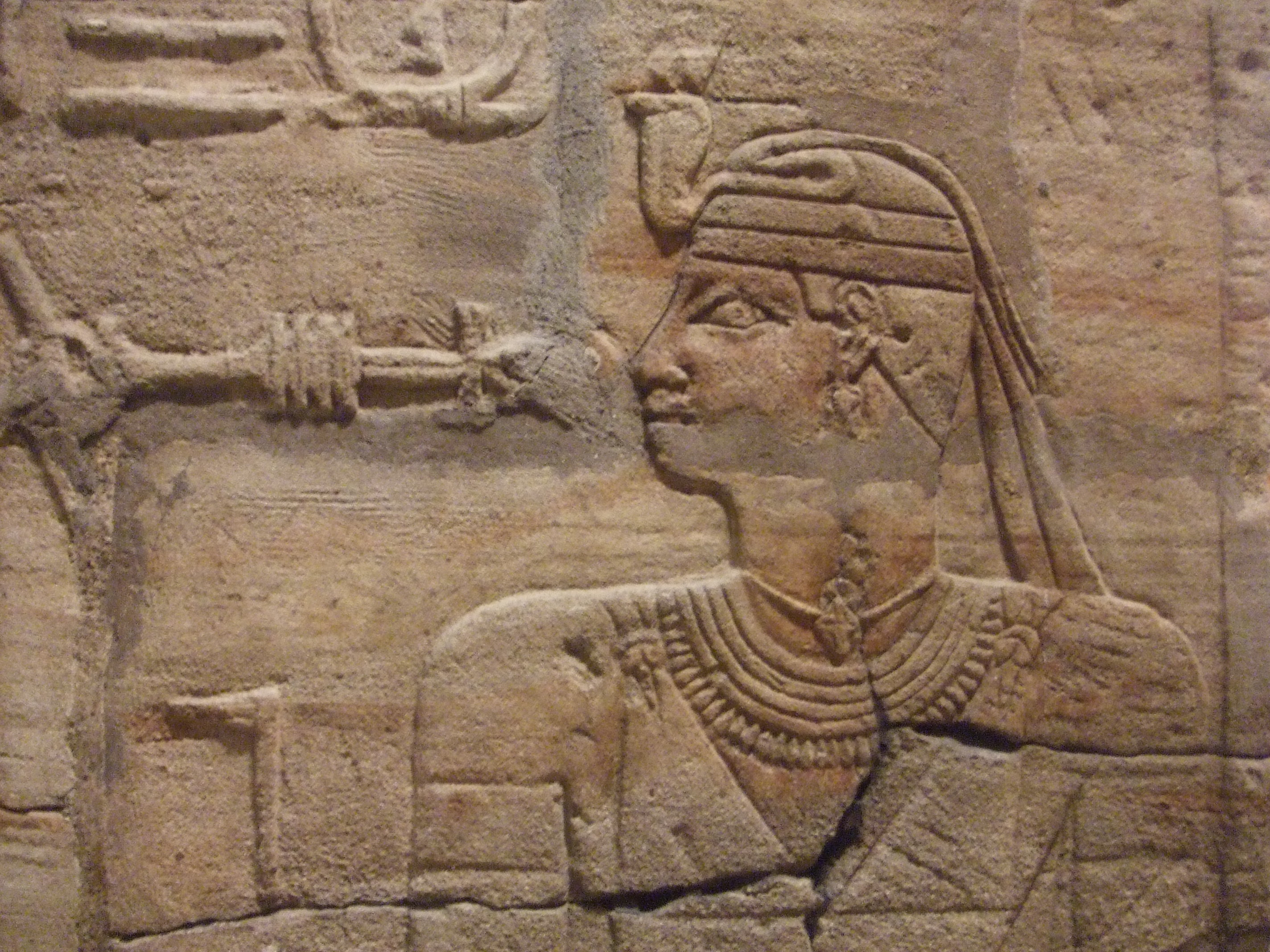
Relief of Taharqa on the shrine

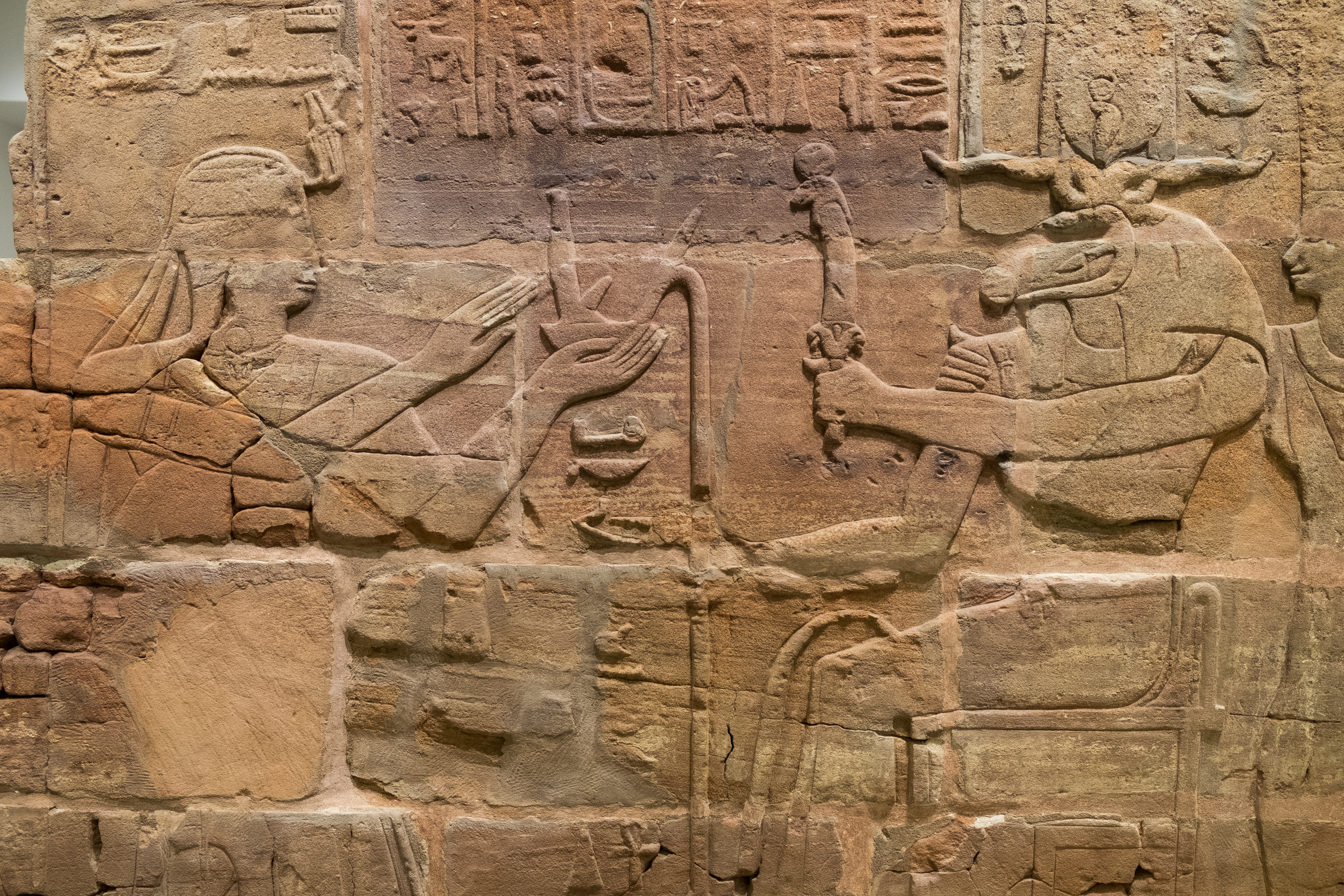
Sandstone wall of King Aspelta offering Ma'at (Truth) to ram-headed god Amun-Re accompanied by Anukis, Temple T at Kawa Ashmolean Museum I9J2.I295.
