= Atmataka =

Nubian queen

Atmataka was a Nubian queen, so far only known from her burial in the royal cemetery of Nuri. She was perhaps the wife of king Aramatle-qo. Her only known title is king's wife. Her burial consisted of a pyramid and the underground burial rooms. There was a staircase going underground and leading to the two burial chambers. The burial was found robbed, but fragments of at least 158 shabtis were found. They bear the name and the title of the queen. Her heart scarab was found in Nuri burial Nu. 47. The owner of this burial is not known.
