= 566 BC =

Year

566 BC in various calendars
- Gregorian calendar: 566 BC; DLXVI BC
- Ab urbe condita: 188
- Ancient Egypt era: XXVI dynasty, 99
- Pharaoh: Amasis II, 5
- Ancient Greek Olympiad (summer): 53rd Olympiad, year 3
- Assyrian calendar: 4185
- Balinese saka calendar: N/A
- Bengali calendar: −1159 – −1158
- Berber calendar: 385
- Buddhist calendar: −21
- Burmese calendar: −1203
- Byzantine calendar: 4943–4944
- Chinese calendar: 甲午年 (Wood Horse); 2132 or 1925 — to — 乙未年 (Wood Goat); 2133 or 1926
- Coptic calendar: −849 – −848
- Discordian calendar: 601
- Ethiopian calendar: −573 – −572
- Hebrew calendar: 3195–3196
- Hindu calendars
- Vikram Samvat: −509 – −508
- Shaka Samvat: N/A
- Kali Yuga: 2535–2536
- Holocene calendar: 9435
- Iranian calendar: 1187 BP – 1186 BP
- Islamic calendar: 1223 BH – 1222 BH
- Javanese calendar: N/A
- Julian calendar: N/A
- Korean calendar: 1768
- Minguo calendar: 2477 before ROC 民前2477年
- Nanakshahi calendar: −2033
- Thai solar calendar: −23 – −22
- Tibetan calendar: ཤིང་ཕོ་རྟ་ལོ་ (male Wood-Horse) −439 or −820 or −1592 — to — ཤིང་མོ་ལུག་ལོ་ (female Wood-Sheep) −438 or −819 or −1591

The year 566 BC was a year of the pre-Julian Roman calendar. In the Roman Empire, it was known as year 188 Ab urbe condita. The denomination 566 BC for this year has been used since the early medieval period, when the Anno Domini calendar era became the prevalent method in Europe for naming years.

== Events ==
=== By place ===
==== Athens ====
- The first known Panathenaic Games of Ancient Greece are conducted in Athens.

==== India ====
- Vardhamana attained True Knowledge and became Mahavira.

== Births ==
- Zerubbabel, Jewish leader.
- Buddha, the founder of Buddhism. Although it is unknown for certain what his birth year was, 566 BCE is the most commonly given date.
