= 567 BC =

567 BC in various calendars
- Gregorian calendar: 567 BC; DLXVII BC
- Ab urbe condita: 187
- Ancient Egypt era: XXVI dynasty, 98
- Pharaoh: Amasis II, 4
- Ancient Greek Olympiad (summer): 53rd Olympiad, year 2
- Assyrian calendar: 4184
- Balinese saka calendar: N/A
- Bengali calendar: −1160 – −1159
- Berber calendar: 384
- Buddhist calendar: −22
- Burmese calendar: −1204
- Byzantine calendar: 4942–4943
- Chinese calendar: 癸巳年 (Water Snake); 2131 or 1924 — to — 甲午年 (Wood Horse); 2132 or 1925
- Coptic calendar: −850 – −849
- Discordian calendar: 600
- Ethiopian calendar: −574 – −573
- Hebrew calendar: 3194–3195
- Hindu calendars
- Vikram Samvat: −510 – −509
- Shaka Samvat: N/A
- Kali Yuga: 2534–2535
- Holocene calendar: 9434
- Iranian calendar: 1188 BP – 1187 BP
- Islamic calendar: 1225 BH – 1223 BH
- Javanese calendar: N/A
- Julian calendar: N/A
- Korean calendar: 1767
- Minguo calendar: 2478 before ROC 民前2478年
- Nanakshahi calendar: −2034
- Thai solar calendar: −24 – −23
- Tibetan calendar: ཆུ་མོ་སྦྲུལ་ལོ་ (female Water-Snake) −440 or −821 or −1593 — to — ཤིང་ཕོ་རྟ་ལོ་ (male Wood-Horse) −439 or −820 or −1592

The year 567 BC was a year of the pre-Julian Roman calendar. In the Roman Empire, it was known as year 187 Ab urbe condita. The denomination 567 BC for this year has been used since the early medieval period, when the Anno Domini calendar era became the prevalent method in Europe for naming years.

== Events ==
- Deposed pharaoh Apries invades Egypt with Babylonian help but is defeated by Amasis II.
- May 25—Servius Tullius, king of Rome, celebrates a triumph for his victory over the Etruscans.

== Deaths ==
- Apries, ruler of ancient Egypt.
