= Piankhher =

Nubian queen

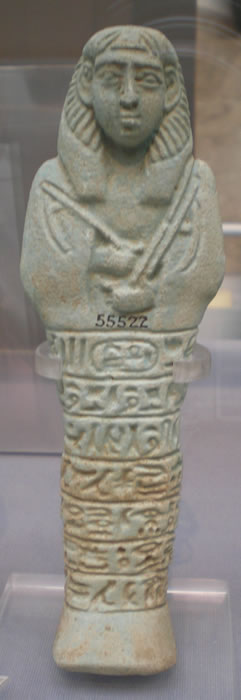
Shabti figure of Pianckher

Piankhher (Pi-ankh-her) was a Nubian queen with the Egyptian title king's wife. Her royal husband is not known for sure, but may have been Aramatle-qo based on chronology. Piankhher is known solely from her burial at Nuri (Nu 57). Her burial consisted of a pyramid, that was completely gone when excavated. There is a staircase going down to the two burial chambers that were found to have been looted. Some golden and silver amulets were found. About 200 shabtis, many only in fragments, were discovered too. They provided her name and title.
