= Sanam, Sudan =

Village and archaeological site in Sudan

Coordinates: 18°29′N 31°49′E

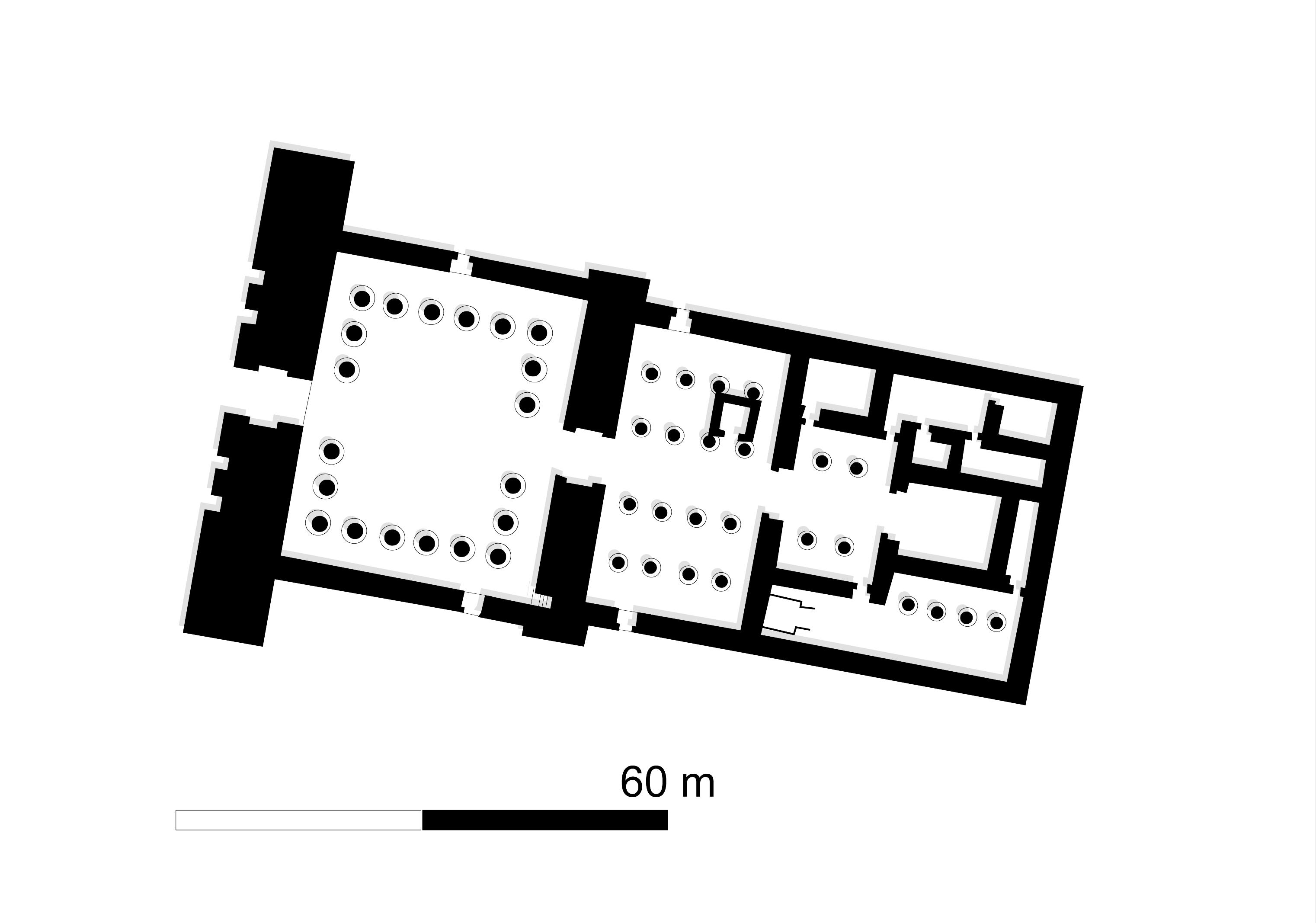
Plan of the temple at Sanam

Sanam is a modern village in Sudan. It is located at the bank of the Nile river next to Merowe.

Here were found the remains of an ancient town which flourished mainly in the Napatan Period. These are perhaps the remains of Napata, the capital of the Kushite empire from about 800 to 300 BC. Parts of the town were excavated in 1912 to 1913 by Francis Llewellyn Griffith. The excavation was focused on numerous distinct structures He found the remains of a badly preserved temple and of a building he called treasury. The temple was built under king Taharqo with additions by king Aspelta. Most importantly, he excavated a big cemetery belonging to the inhabitants of the town. This is one of the few so far excavated cemeteries of this period belonging to "common" people.

== Structures ==
The Treasury is 267m long and is the largest in Sanam. The treasury, while mostly empty, contained elephant tusks and could have stored royal goods due to its size. The excavations by Griffith, with additions by others, produced a drawing of the specifications of the Treasury. The treasury, extensive in size, also contained a courtyard with 35 rooms surrounding it. The Treasury was ruined by a fire but most of it had been cleared prior to the destruction. Griffith revealed a seal that would anticipate the treasury existed from 747-716 BC to 593-568 BC. The goods were not only stored here but distributed from the Treasury.

East of the Treasury, was SA.K 300, which was the workshop for goods that were traded at a high value. There is a royal seal of various on the goods was indicative of the fact that the workshop products were for royal goods. The building was 39x35 meters. There were eleven rooms, nine of which were opening to the courtyard. The excavations revealed pottery and the presence of ceramics. There were no residences, and in addition to workspace, there was storage for materials.

Near the treasury is the temple that was built under Taharqo. During Griffith’s excavations, he discovered the temple, which was dedicated to the god Amun. It was surrounded by Royal buildings. It was modeled after Egyptian Monuments.

The cemetery contained 1,500 tombs did not contain the royal in the original excavations by Griffith. There was a second cemetery associated with the same settlement, Eltameer, that was the burial place for the higher-status individuals. This is indicative of a power divide and social hierarchy.

== Recent Archaeological Studies ==
From 2016 to 2018, archaeologists, Tucker and Emberling used the geophysical prospection method to document the settlement around Sanam. The method used was magnetic gradiometry which reveals a 2-dimensional map of the surveyed area. The surveying that was planned and tested extensively, revealed multiple structures. These surveys included both the Treasury and the Temple.

Although the surveys revealed a large number of structures, there were no housing structures. Also, many of the buildings were between the Temple and SA.K 300. The archaeologists mapped and described the specific dimensions and features of 7 buildings. The surveys and excavations reveal the use of these structures from the Napatan through the Meroitic periods.

== Bibliogrophy ==
- Griffith, Francis Llewellyn (1922). "Oxford Excavations in Nubia, VIII–XVII: Napata, Sanam Temple, Treasury and Town". Annals of Archaeology and Anthropology, 9, pp. 67–124.
- Griffith, Francis Llewellyn (1923). "Oxford Excavations in Nubia, XVIII–XXV". Annals of Archaeology and Anthropology, 10, pp. 73–171.
- Lohwasser, Angelika (2010). The Kushite Cemetery of Sanam: A Non-Royal Burial Ground of the Nubian Capital, c. 800–600 BC. London: Golden House Publications.
- Lohwasser, Angelika (2012). Aspekte der napatanischen Gesellschaft: Archäologisches Inventar und funeräre Praxis im Friedhof von Sanam – Perspektiven einer kulturhistorischen Interpretation. Vienna: Austrian Academy of Sciences Press.
- Pope, Jeremy W. (2014). The Double Kingdom under Taharqo: Studies in the History of Kush and Egypt, c. 690–664 BC. Leiden: Brill.
- Howley, Kathryn (2018). "Return to Taharqo's Temple at Sanam: The Inaugural Field Season of the Sanam Temple Project". Sudan & Nubia, 22, pp. 81–88.
- Tucker, Gregory, and Geoff Emberling (2018). "Settlement in the Heartland of Napatan Kush: Preliminary Results of Magnetic Gradiometry at El-Kurru, Jebel Barkal and Sanam". Sudan & Nubia, 22, pp. 50–57.
- Howley, Kathryn (2020). "New Discoveries at Sanam Temple and its Surroundings: Sanam Temple Project, 2019–2020". Sudan & Nubia, 24, pp. 119–128.
- Vincentelli, Irene (2011). "Sanam: The Archaeological Work at the Site". In [publication details should be checked against the original chapter].
- Howley, Kathryn (2026). "Sanam". UCLA Encyclopedia of Egyptology.
