= Asata (Nubian queen) =

Nubian queen

Asata was a Nubian queen with the Egyptian titles king's wife and Person of Egypt. She was presumed to have been the wife of the king Aspelta. Asata is mainly known from her burial at Nuri (Nuri 42). Her burial consisted of a pyramid with a small chapel in front of it. The pyramid was found heavily destroyed, and the chapel was completely gone. There is a staircase going down to two burial chambers that were found to have been looted, but still contained a high number of objects, including the heart scarab of the queen, at least 270 shabtis (providing her name and title), several stone vessels, amulets and other fragments that must have covered the mummy.
