= Artaha =

Nubian queen

< E9 rw tA h >
Artaha
in hieroglyphs
Era: Kingdom of Kush
(780 BC–350 AD)

Artaha was a Nubian queen with the Egyptian title king's wife. She was perhaps the wife of king Aspelta, although this is only a guess. Artaha is only known from her burial at Nuri (Nu 58). Her burial consisted most likely of a pyramid with a small chapel in front of it, but those were totally gone. There is a staircase going down to the one burial chamber that was found looted. The walls were once plastered and painted but the decorated was very much faded when found. Alabaster vessels were found. There were also at least 180 inscribed shabtis, providing her name and title.
