= 568 BC =

568 BC in various calendars
- Gregorian calendar: 568 BC; DLXVIII BC
- Ab urbe condita: 186
- Ancient Egypt era: XXVI dynasty, 97
- Pharaoh: Amasis II, 3
- Ancient Greek Olympiad (summer): 53rd Olympiad (victor)¹
- Assyrian calendar: 4183
- Balinese saka calendar: N/A
- Bengali calendar: −1161 – −1160
- Berber calendar: 383
- Buddhist calendar: −23
- Burmese calendar: −1205
- Byzantine calendar: 4941–4942
- Chinese calendar: 壬辰年 (Water Dragon); 2130 or 1923 — to — 癸巳年 (Water Snake); 2131 or 1924
- Coptic calendar: −851 – −850
- Discordian calendar: 599
- Ethiopian calendar: −575 – −574
- Hebrew calendar: 3193–3194
- Hindu calendars
- Vikram Samvat: −511 – −510
- Shaka Samvat: N/A
- Kali Yuga: 2533–2534
- Holocene calendar: 9433
- Iranian calendar: 1189 BP – 1188 BP
- Islamic calendar: 1226 BH – 1225 BH
- Javanese calendar: N/A
- Julian calendar: N/A
- Korean calendar: 1766
- Minguo calendar: 2479 before ROC 民前2479年
- Nanakshahi calendar: −2035
- Thai solar calendar: −25 – −24
- Tibetan calendar: ཆུ་ཕོ་འབྲུག་ལོ་ (male Water-Dragon) −441 or −822 or −1594 — to — ཆུ་མོ་སྦྲུལ་ལོ་ (female Water-Snake) −440 or −821 or −1593

The year 568 BC was a year of the pre-Julian Roman calendar. In the Roman Empire, it was known as year 186 Ab urbe condita. The denomination 568 BC for this year has been used since the early medieval period, when the Anno Domini calendar era became the prevalent method in Europe for naming years.

== Events ==
- Amtalqa succeeds his brother Aspelta as king of Kush.

== Births ==
Yan Zhengzai

== Deaths ==
- Pittacus of Mytilene, one of the Seven Sages of Greece
- Aspelta, king of Kush
