= 564 BC =

564 BC in various calendars
- Gregorian calendar: 564 BC; DLXIV BC
- Ab urbe condita: 190
- Ancient Egypt era: XXVI dynasty, 101
- Pharaoh: Amasis II, 7
- Ancient Greek Olympiad (summer): 54th Olympiad (victor)¹
- Assyrian calendar: 4187
- Balinese saka calendar: N/A
- Bengali calendar: −1157 – −1156
- Berber calendar: 387
- Buddhist calendar: −19
- Burmese calendar: −1201
- Byzantine calendar: 4945–4946
- Chinese calendar: 丙申年 (Fire Monkey); 2134 or 1927 — to — 丁酉年 (Fire Rooster); 2135 or 1928
- Coptic calendar: −847 – −846
- Discordian calendar: 603
- Ethiopian calendar: −571 – −570
- Hebrew calendar: 3197–3198
- Hindu calendars
- Vikram Samvat: −507 – −506
- Shaka Samvat: N/A
- Kali Yuga: 2537–2538
- Holocene calendar: 9437
- Iranian calendar: 1185 BP – 1184 BP
- Islamic calendar: 1221 BH – 1220 BH
- Javanese calendar: N/A
- Julian calendar: N/A
- Korean calendar: 1770
- Minguo calendar: 2475 before ROC 民前2475年
- Nanakshahi calendar: −2031
- Thai solar calendar: −21 – −20
- Tibetan calendar: མེ་ཕོ་སྤྲེ་ལོ་ (male Fire-Monkey) −437 or −818 or −1590 — to — མེ་མོ་བྱ་ལོ་ (female Fire-Bird) −436 or −817 or −1589

The year 564 BC was a year of the pre-Julian Roman calendar. In the Roman Empire, it was known as year 190 Ab urbe condita. The denomination 564 BC for this year has been used since the early medieval period, when the Anno Domini calendar era became the prevalent method in Europe for naming years.

== Events ==
The 564 B.C. Ancient Olympic Games

== Births ==
- Siddhartha Gautama (The Lord Buddha), Religious Leader of Buddhism

== Deaths ==
- Aesop, Greek fable writer
- Arrhichion, Greek champion in pankration (martial arts) in the ancient Olympic Games
