= Aramatle-qo =

Wadjkare Aramatle-qo
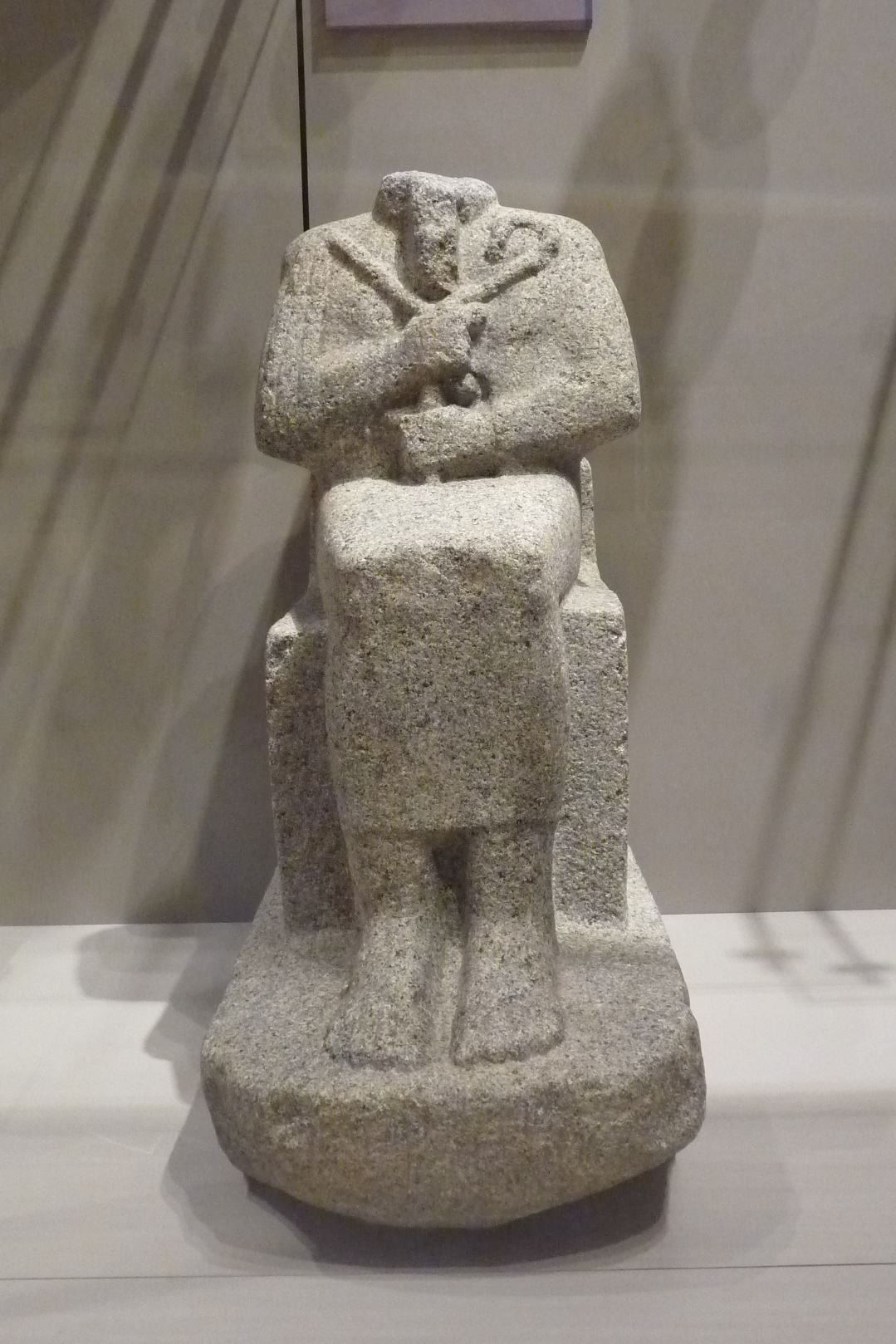
- Sitting statue of Aramatle-qo. Ägyptisches Museum, Berlin (ÄM 2249)

Kushite King of Meroë
- Reign: c. 580–555 BCE
- Predecessor: Aspelta
- Successor: Malonaqen
Royal titulary
Prenomen
Wadjkare ("Re is one whose ka endures")
Nomen
Aramatle-qo

G39 N5	G5 U1 U33 E23 N29
- Consorts: Atamataka, Piankh-her, Maletasen, Amanitakaye, Akheqa?
- Children: King Malonaqen
- Father: Aspelta
- Mother: Queen Henuttakhbit
- Burial: Nuri 9

Aramatle-qo or Amtalqa was a Kushite king.

Dunham and Macadam, as well as Török, mentions that Aramatle-qo used the following prenomen and nomen:

== Family ==
Aramatle-qo was the son and successor of King Aspelta and Queen Henuttakhbit. He had several wives:

- Atmataka, her pyramid is located at Nuri (Nu. 55). A heart-scarab belonging to Atamataka was found in Nu. 57.
- Piankhher. Buried at Nuri (Nu. 57)
- Akhe(qa?) was a daughter of Aspelta (and possibly Henuttakhbit). She may have been a sister wife of Aramatle-qo. She is buried at Nuri (Nu. 38)
- Amanitakaye, was a daughter of Aspelta and a sister-wife of Aramatle-qo. She is the mother of King Malonaqen. Buried at Nuri (Nu. 26). Known from a shawabti and other funerary items.
- Maletasen is known from many shabtis. She was buried at Nuri (Nu. 39).

== Monuments ==
Aramatle-qo is primarily attested by his pyramid Nu 9 in Nuri which dates to the end of the 6th or the 5th century BC. A votive object bearing his name originates from Meroe. A piece of jewelry from Aramatle-qo's pyramid, a gold collar necklace which bears his name, was found here. It may have belonged to the king himself or to one of his courtiers.

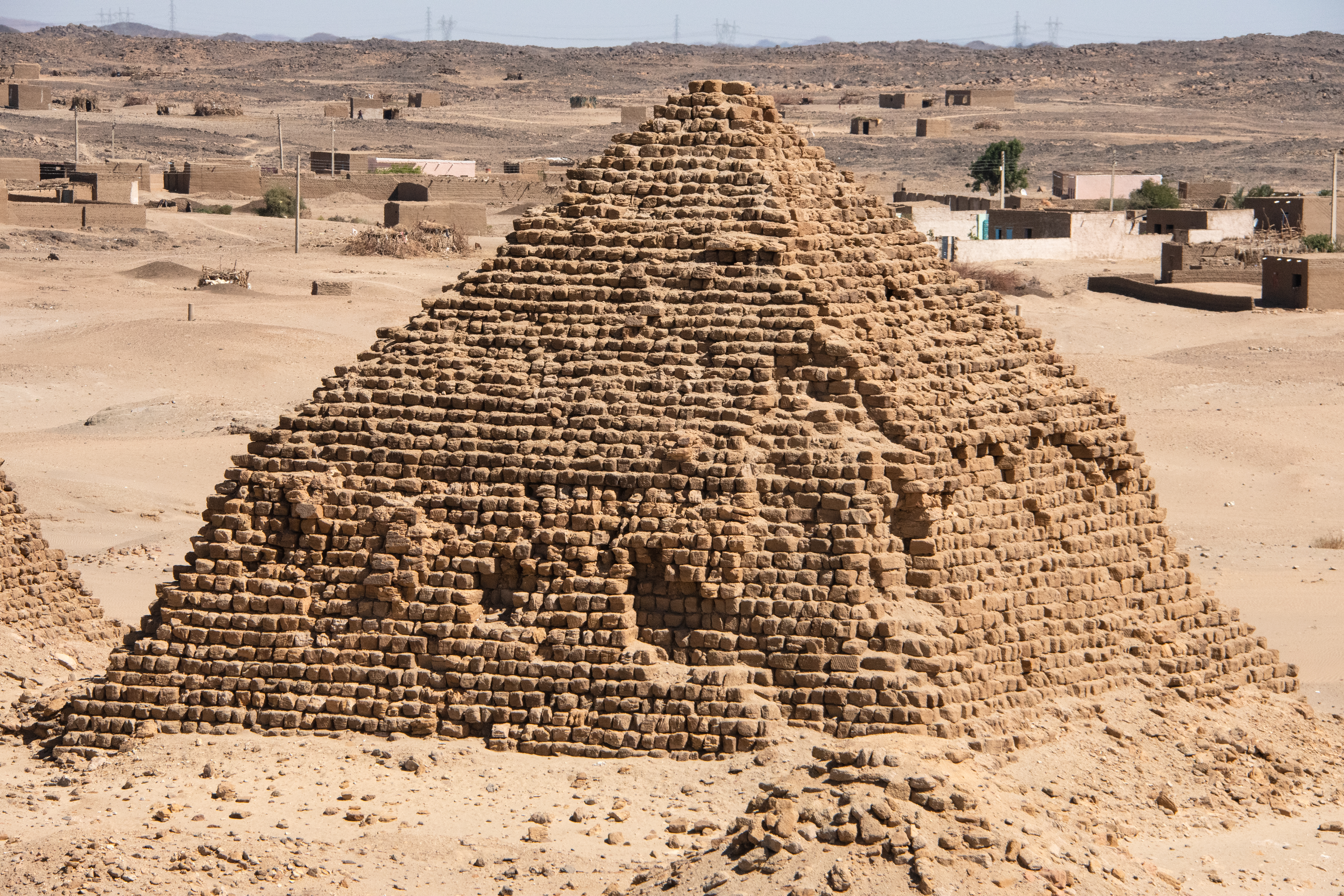
Nuri pyramid IX of Aramatle-qo.

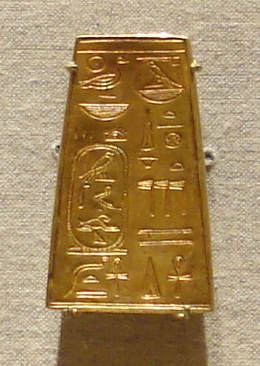
Napatan necklace spacer made of gold, 6th century BC. It is inscribed with Egyptian hieroglyphs in the name of Aramatle-qo.

Preceded by Aspelta	Rulers of Kush	Succeeded by Malonaqen
