= Aspelta =

Kushite King

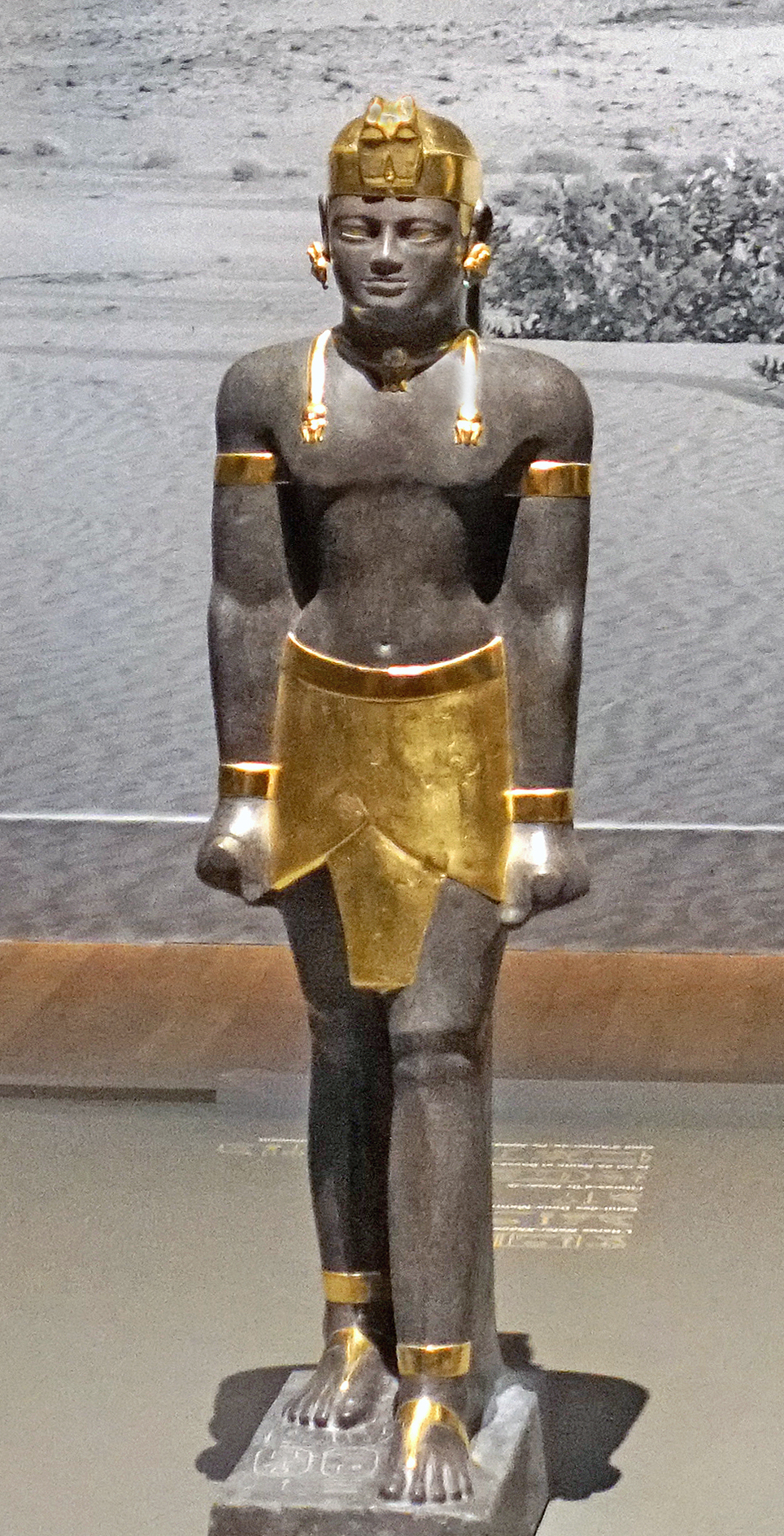
- Aspelta statue reconstruction, with Egyptian headdress. Louvre Museum

Kushite King of Napata and Meroë
- Reign: 600–592 BCE (Napata); 592–c. 580 BCE (Meroë)
- Predecessor: Anlamani
- Successor: Aramatle-qo
Royal titulary
Horus name
Neferkha ("Whose Appearances are Beautiful")
Nebty name
Neferkha ("Whose Appearances are Beautiful")
Golden Horus
Userib ("Whose heart is strong")
Prenomen
Merykare ("Re is one whose ka is loved")
Nomen
Aspelta

G39 N5	i z p rw tA
- Consorts: Madiqen?, Henuttakhebit possibly, Meqemale (?), Asata and Artaha (possible)
- Children: Aramatle-qo, Queen Amanitakaye
- Father: Senkamanisken?
- Mother: Nasalsa
- Died: c. 580 BCE
- Burial: Nuri (Nu. 8)

Aspelta was a ruler of the kingdom of Kush (c. 600 – c. 580 BCE). More is known about him and his reign than most of the rulers of Kush. He left several stelae carved with accounts of his reign.

== Family ==
Aspelta was the son of Senkamanisken and Queen Nasalsa. Aspelta was the brother and successor of Anlamani. The King is thought to have had several wives, including Henuttakhebit (buried in pyramid Nuri 28), Meqemale (buried in pyramid Nuri 40), Asata (buried in pyramid Nuri 42), Artaha (buried in pyramid Nuri 58). he may have also been married to his sister Madiqen.

== Reign ==
According to relevant inscriptions, Aspelta was selected as ruler by a committee of twenty-four religious and military leaders. He then set out north to Napata to be selected as king by the gods and crowned.

Another stele that might date from Aspelta's reign recounts how a group of priests were put to death, likely as punishment for conspiring against the king.

In 592 BCE, Kush was invaded by an Egyptian military expedition initiated by Pharaoh Psamtik II perhaps because Aspelta posed a threat to this pharaoh's authority over Upper Egypt, to the south and close to Kush. The invaders sacked Napata, and some historians believe that because of this attack, Aspelta decided to move the Nubian capital to the more secure city of Meroë.

== Tomb ==
Aspelta's tomb was located at Nuri and is the second largest burial structure here. His tomb was excavated by George A. Reisner in 1916 and many items were discovered within it, most of which are now in the Museum of Fine Arts in Boston. The palace built by him and his brother was excavated by Reisner in 1920.

== Monuments and items mentioning Aspelta ==
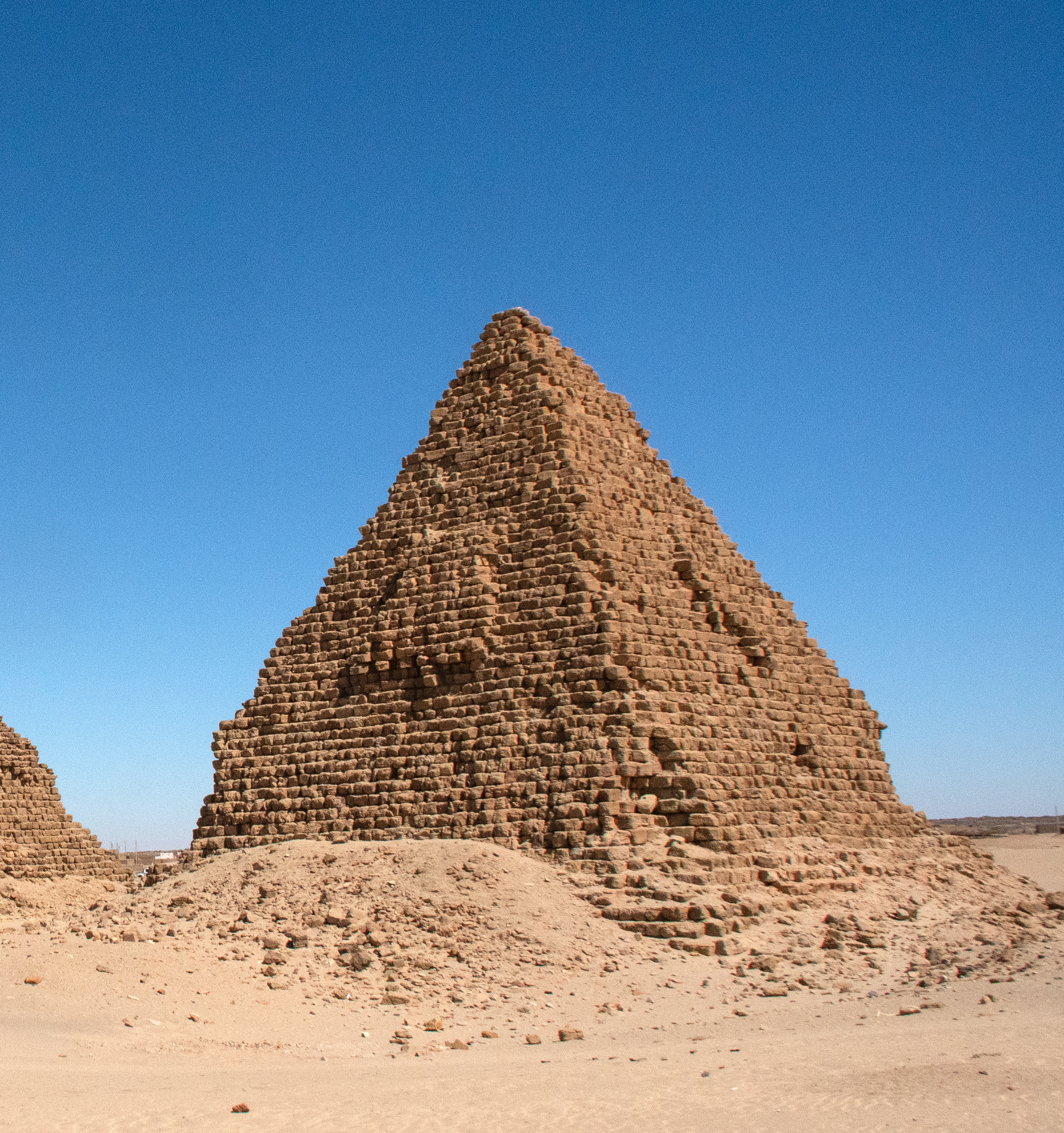
Nuri pyramid Nu VIII of King Aspelta, the best preserved of the pyramids in Nuri.

Aspelta is well attested. A list of items mentioning the King:

- Two cartouche-plaques of Aspelta (Ashmolean Mus. 1932.749 and Brussels, E.7010) from the West side room Temple A at Kawa.
- Fragments of granite stela of Aspelta (Ashmolean Mus. I9J2.I295) found in south-east corner of the Court in Temple T at Kawa.
- Wall depicting Aspelta, (Oxford, Ashmolean Mus. 1936.662). One scene shows the King offering image of Maat to the ram-headed god Amun-Re and Anukis-Nethy, another shows King before Amun-Re and Mut.
- Granite stela (Berlin Mus. 2268). The scene depicts Nastasen and the Queen-Mother Pelkha and similarly Nastasen with Queen Sakhmakh. The text is dated to year 8, and mentions King Aspelta, Harsiotef, Alara and Kambasuden. The stela probably comes from Gebel Barkal.
- A shrine dedicated to Aspelta was found at the temple in Sanam.
- Stela of Aspelta (Louvre C. 257) Possibly from Sanam.
- A diorite stela of Khaliut, the Mayor of Kanad, son of Pi'ankhy, was erected by Aspelta. The text mention's the Queen-Mother Nasalsa.
- Enthronement-stela, year I of Aspelta with scene at top showing the Queen-Mother Nasalsa (Cairo Mus. Ent. 48866), was found at Gebel Barkal.
- Adoption-stela from year 3 of Aspelta probably from Sanam. The text records the appointment of Henuttakhebit as priestess of Napata. The King is shown with his mother Queen Nasalsa and Queen Madiqen.
- Statue of Aspelta (Boston Mus. 2J.7JO)
- A fragment of one of the canopic jars of Aspelta was found in Room A of the tomb of Anlamani (Nuri 6).
- Tomb Nuri 8 belonged to Aspelta. Excavated by Reisner in 1917. Four foundation deposits which include tablets and cups are now spread over several museums. A stela from the chapel was later reused in Tomb Nuri 100. The tomb had three burial chambers and included the sarcophagus of the King. Finds include: Gold and silver vases, inscribed gold vase (Boston Museum 20.341), Silver-spouted beaker (Boston Mus. 24.901.), Gold cylinders (Boston Mus. 21.339-40), Inscribed alabaster jars (Khartum Mus. 1386 A, Boston M us. 20.1070), Two canopic jars (Boston Mus. 20.1062), Porphyry offering-table (Boston Mus. 21.1192).
- Two alabaster jars with the name of Aspelta, found in tomb S.44 in the South Cemetery of Meroe (Boston Mus. 24.886, Khartum Mus. 182I)
- Alabaster vase with name of Aspelta, a faience fragment with cartouche of Aspelta (Brussels E. 3539, E. 3977) and faience fragment with cartouches of Aspelta (Copenhagen, Ny Carlsberg Glypt. IE.I.N. 1307-8)

== Artifacts ==
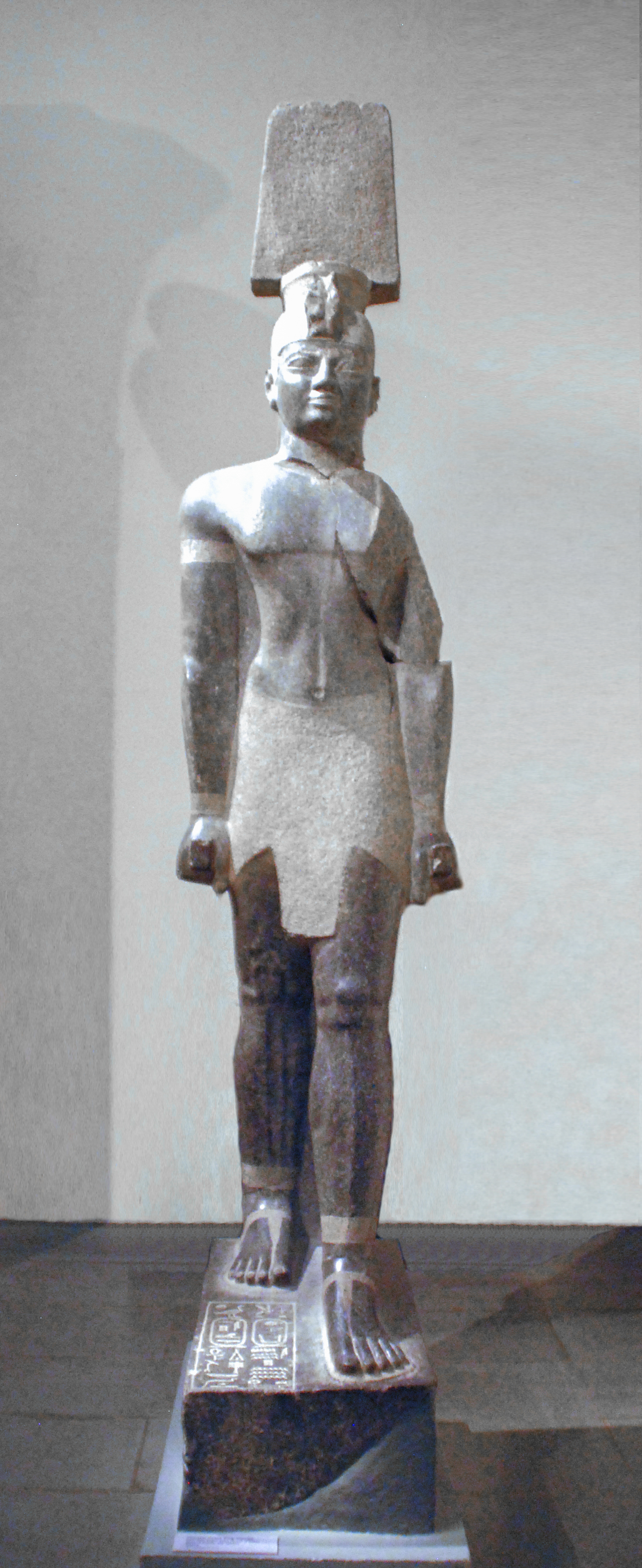
Colossal statue of King Aspelta from Jebel Barkal, Boston Museum of Fine Arts.

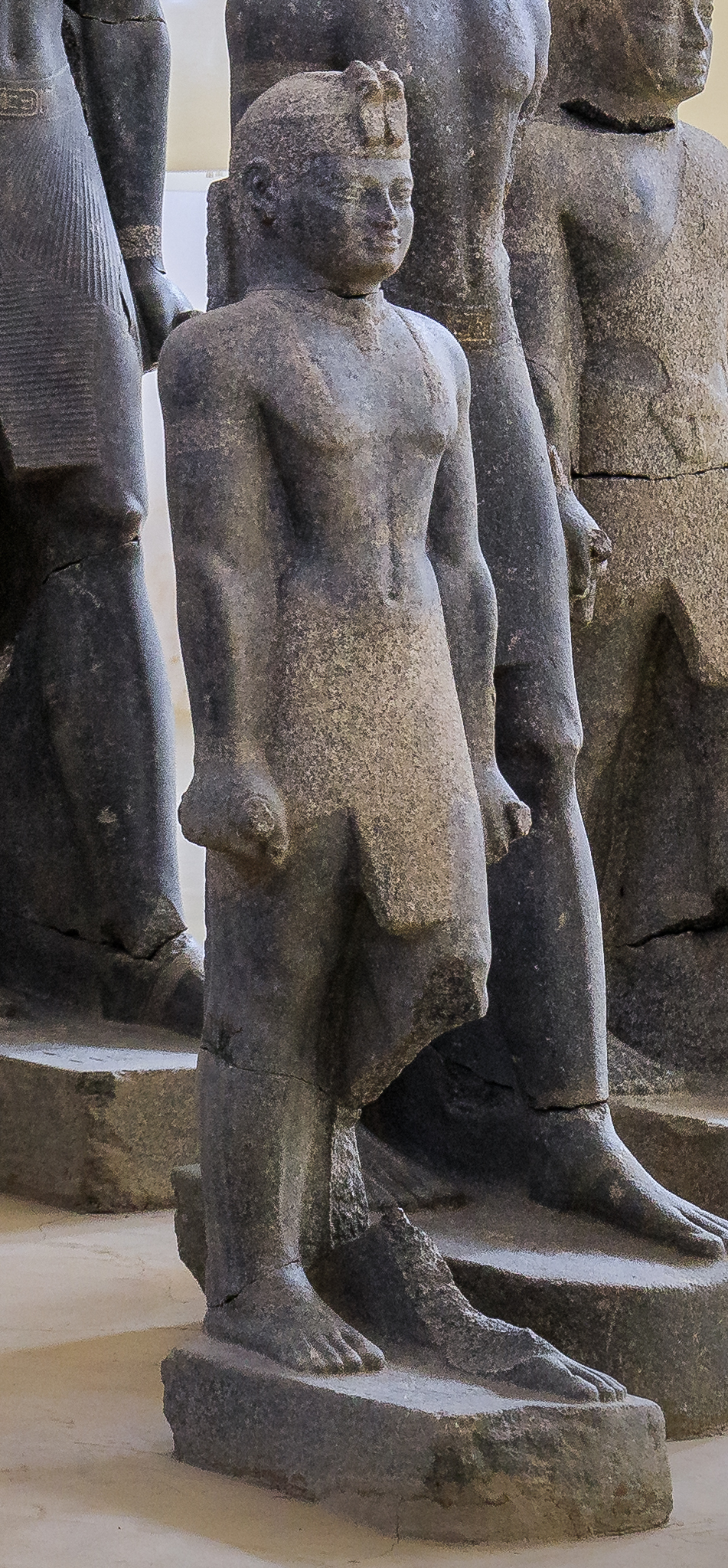
Statue of Aspelta, Kerma Museum

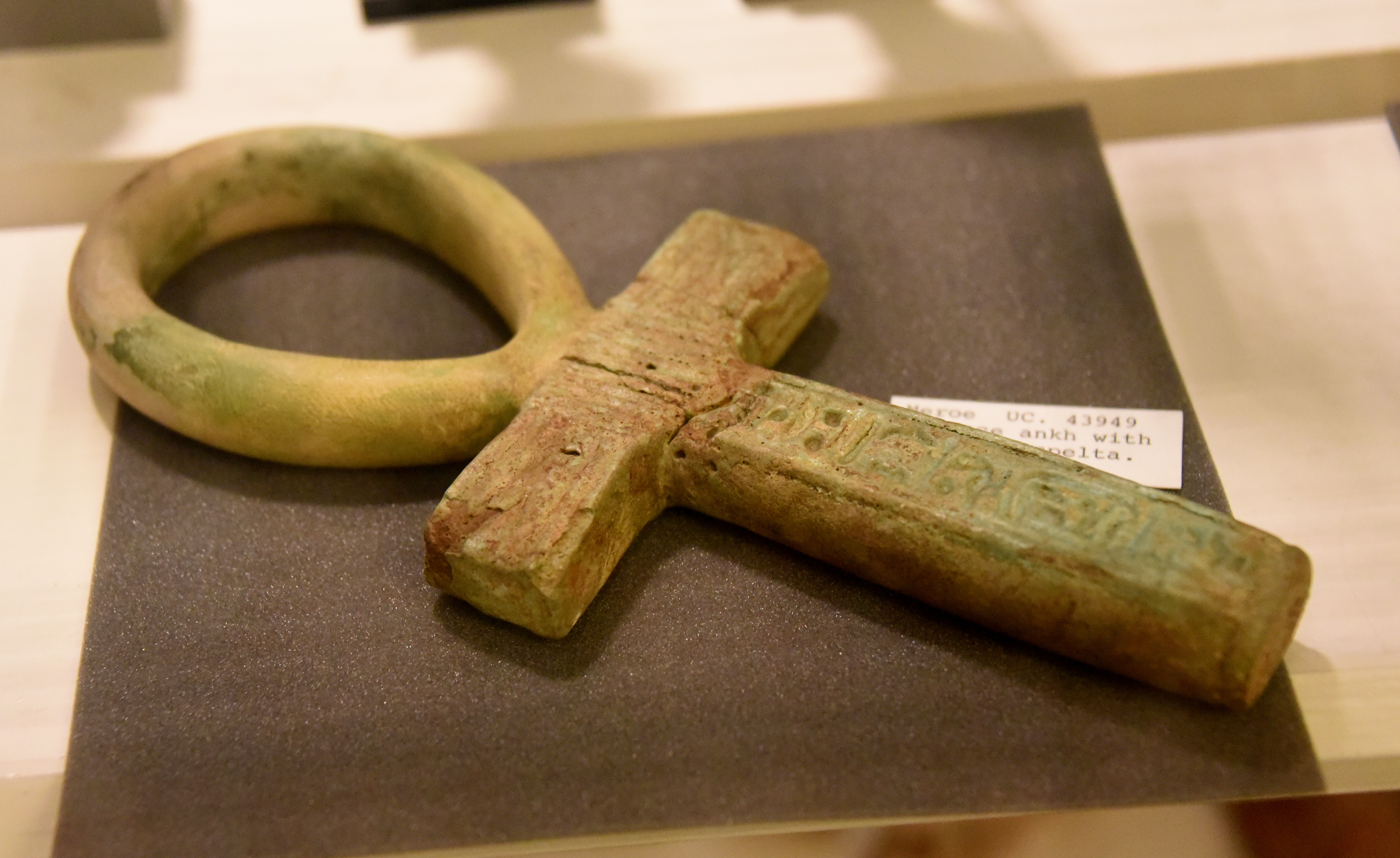
Faience ankh showing the cartouches and epithets of Aspelta. Votive offering. From Meroe, modern-day Sudan. Petrie Museum of Egyptian Archaeology, London

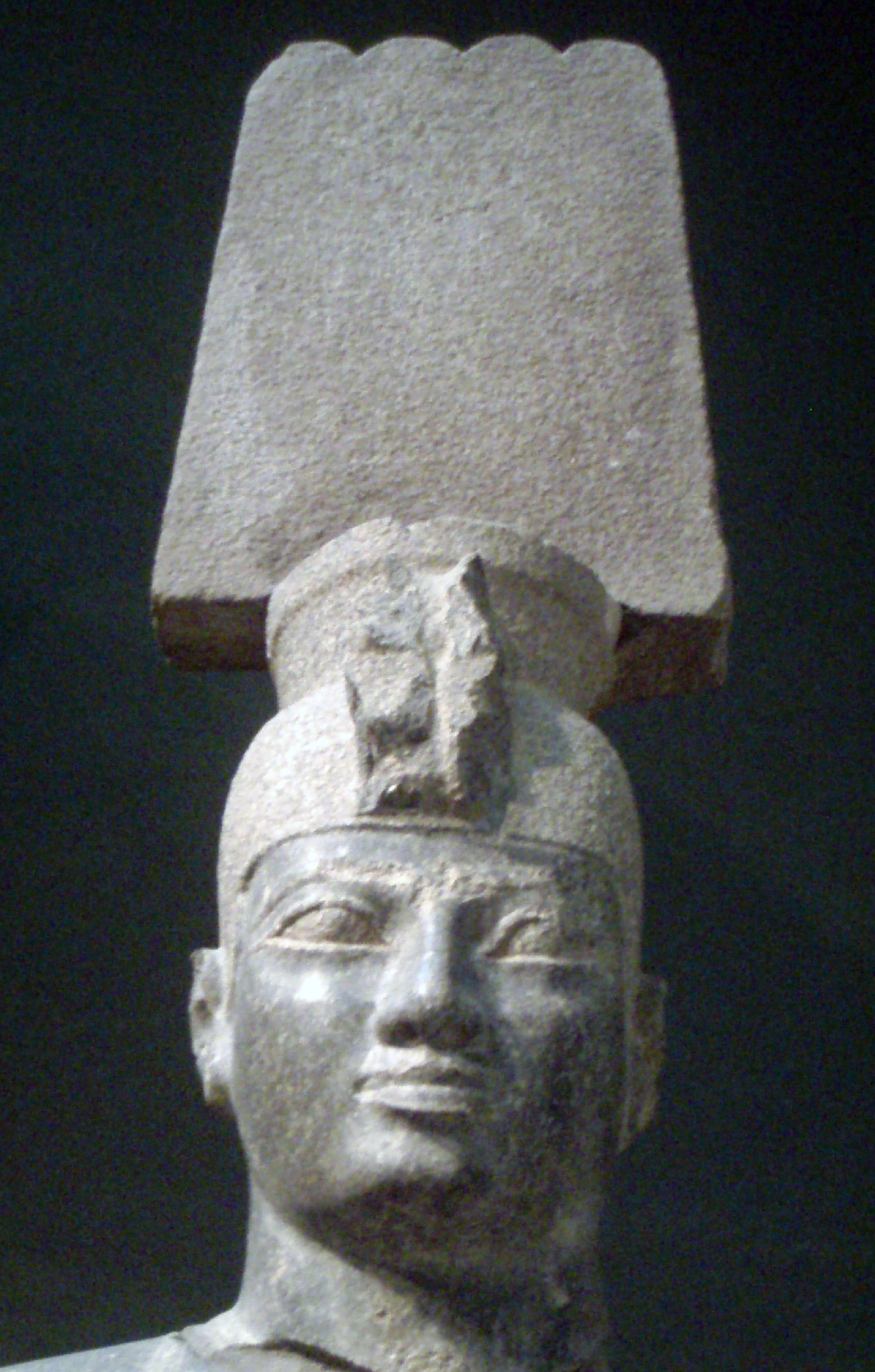
Statue from Jebel Barkal

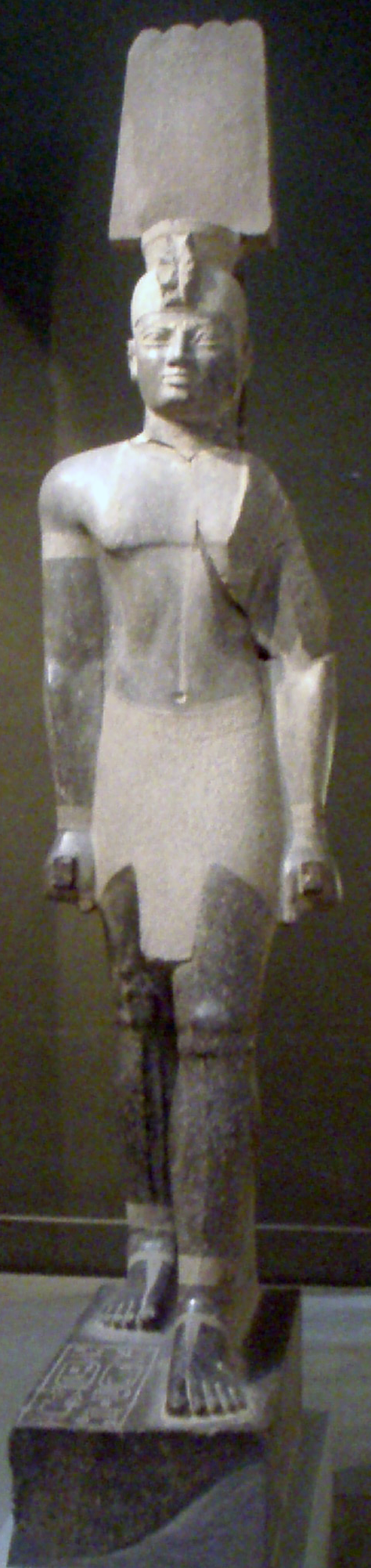
Statue from Jebel Barkal

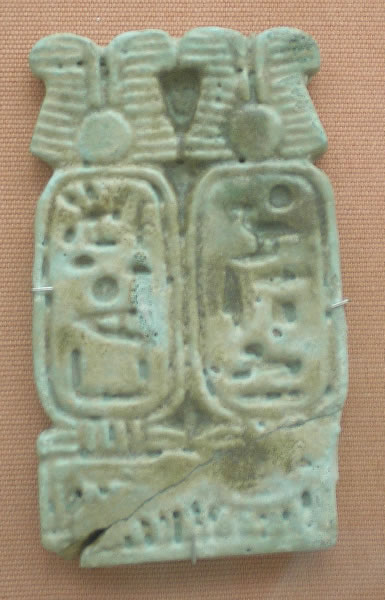
Cartouche of Aspelta, British Museum

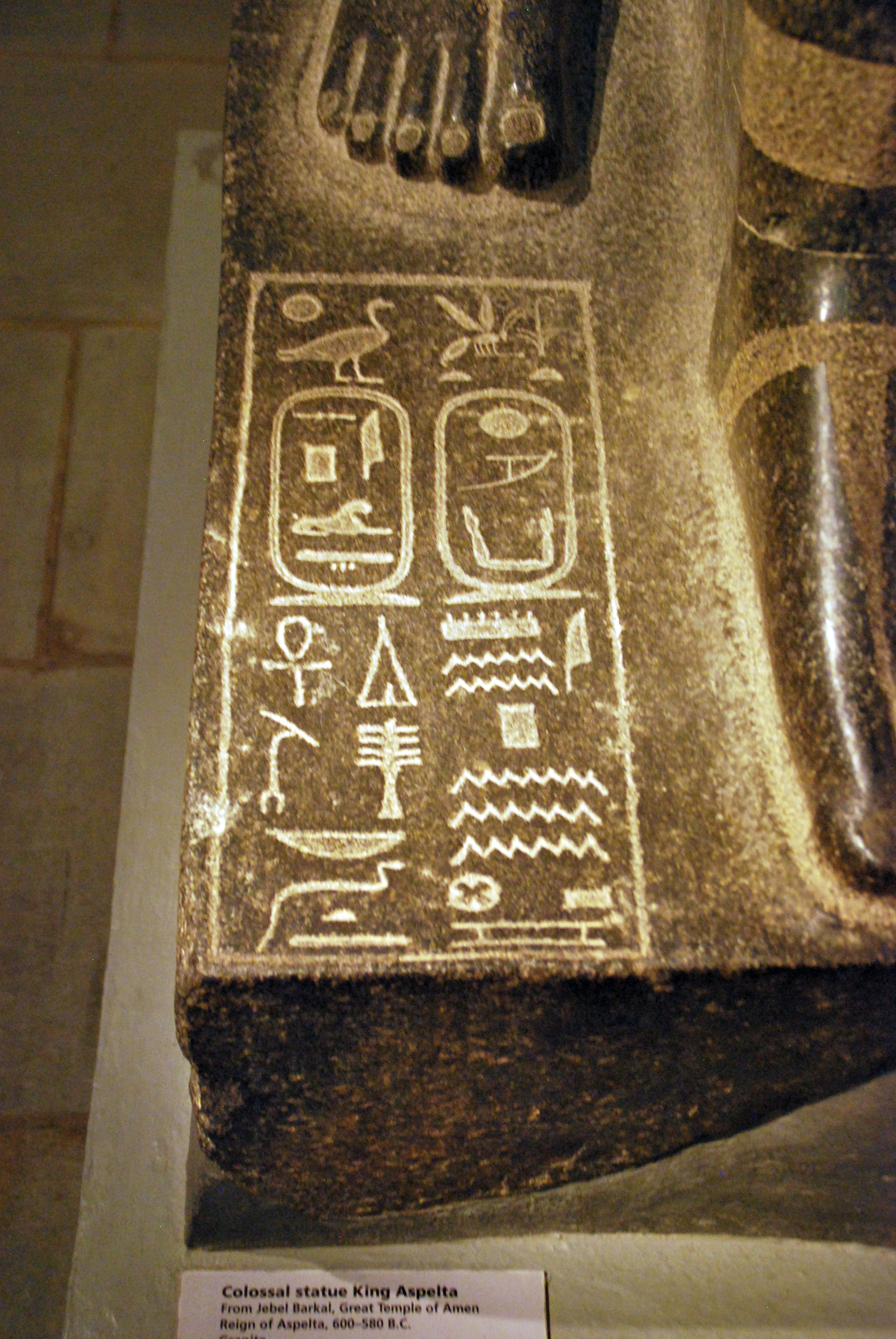
Name of Aspelta on his statue

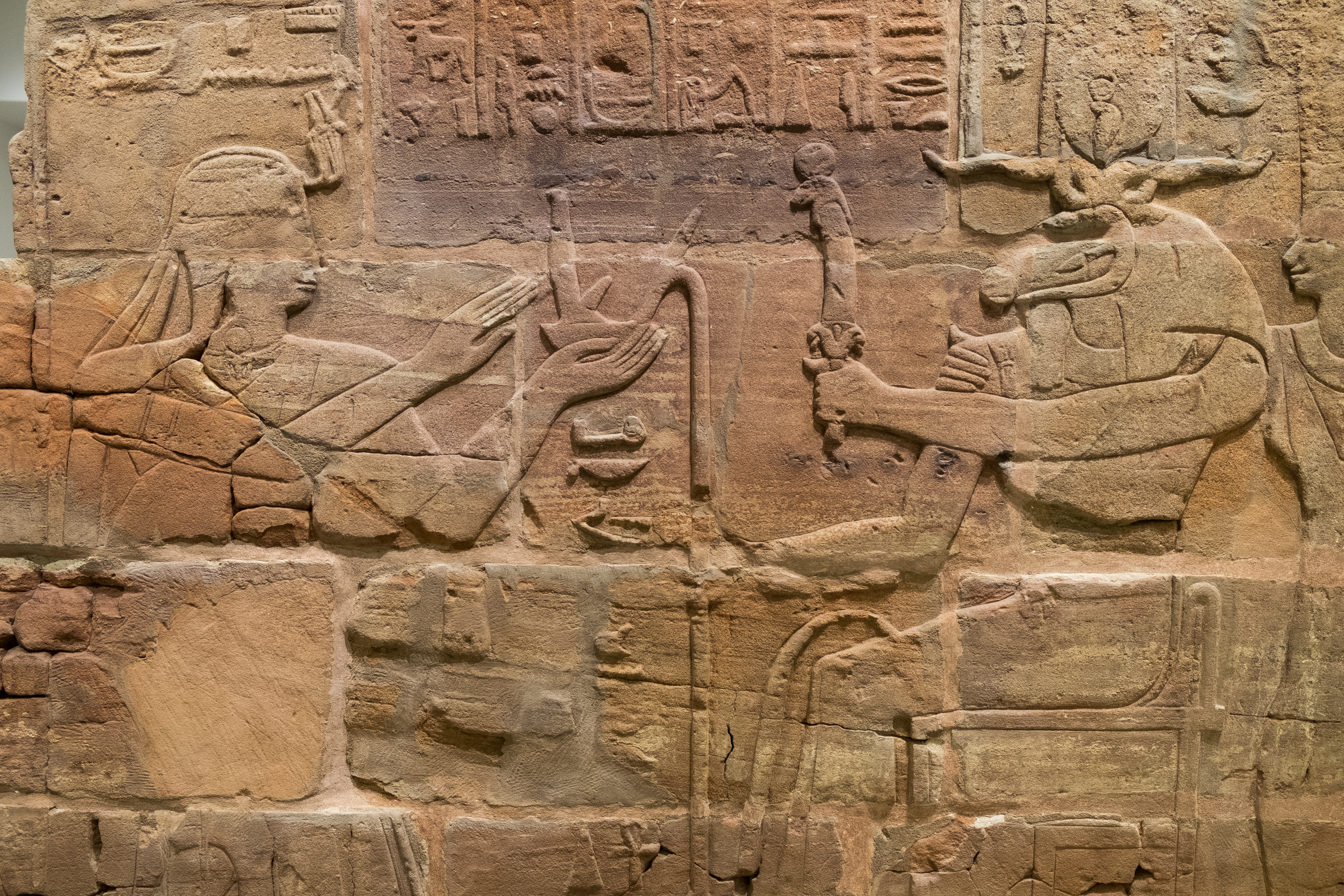
Sandstone wall of King Aspelta offering Ma'at (Truth) to ram-headed god Amun-Re accompanied by Anukis, Temple T at Kawa. Ashmolean Museum I9J2.I295.

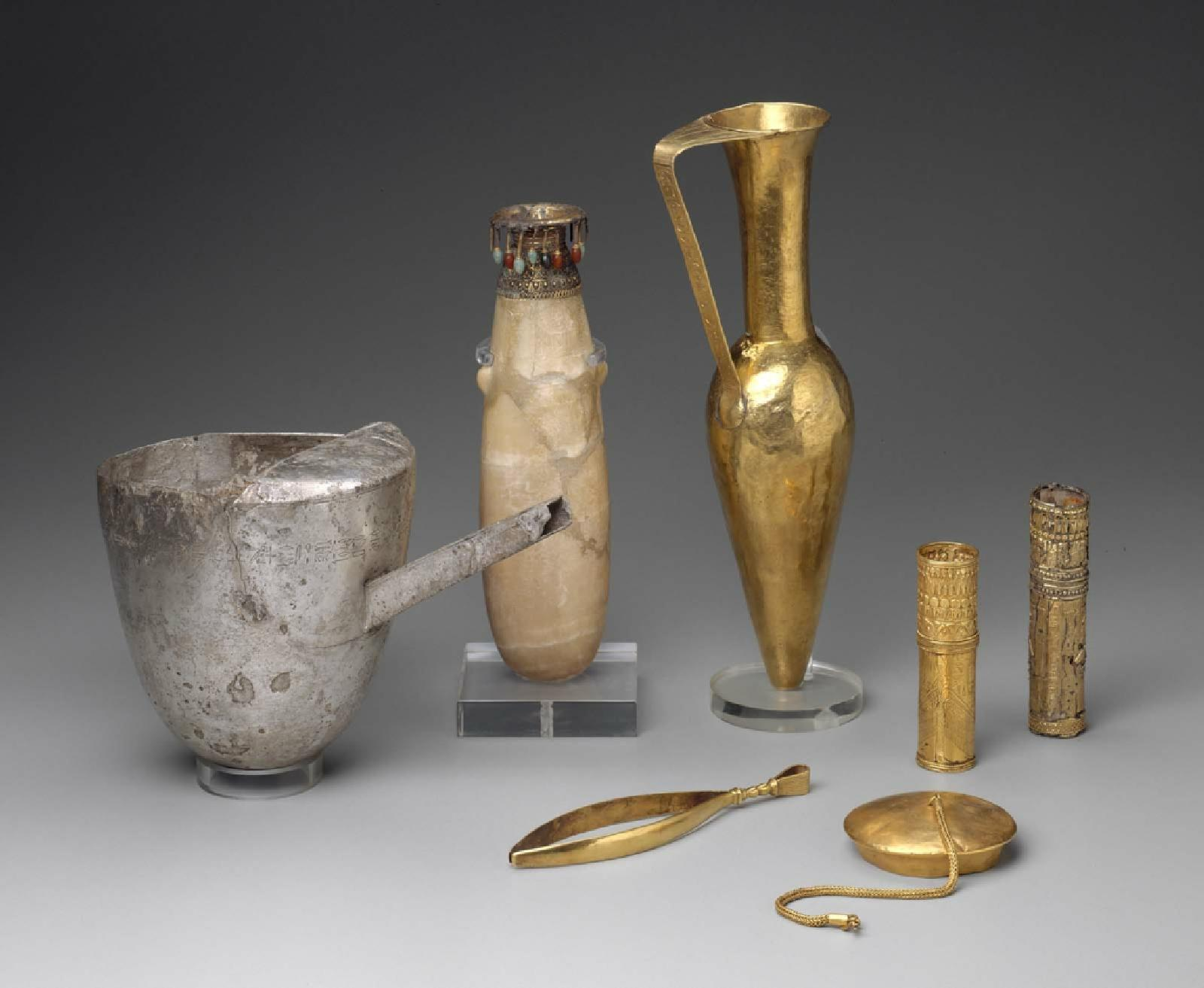
Artifacts including large metal tweezers, decorated and inscribed vessels, gold sheaths, and a ewer marked for King Aspelta found in Nuri pyramid 8. Museum of Fine Arts, Boston.

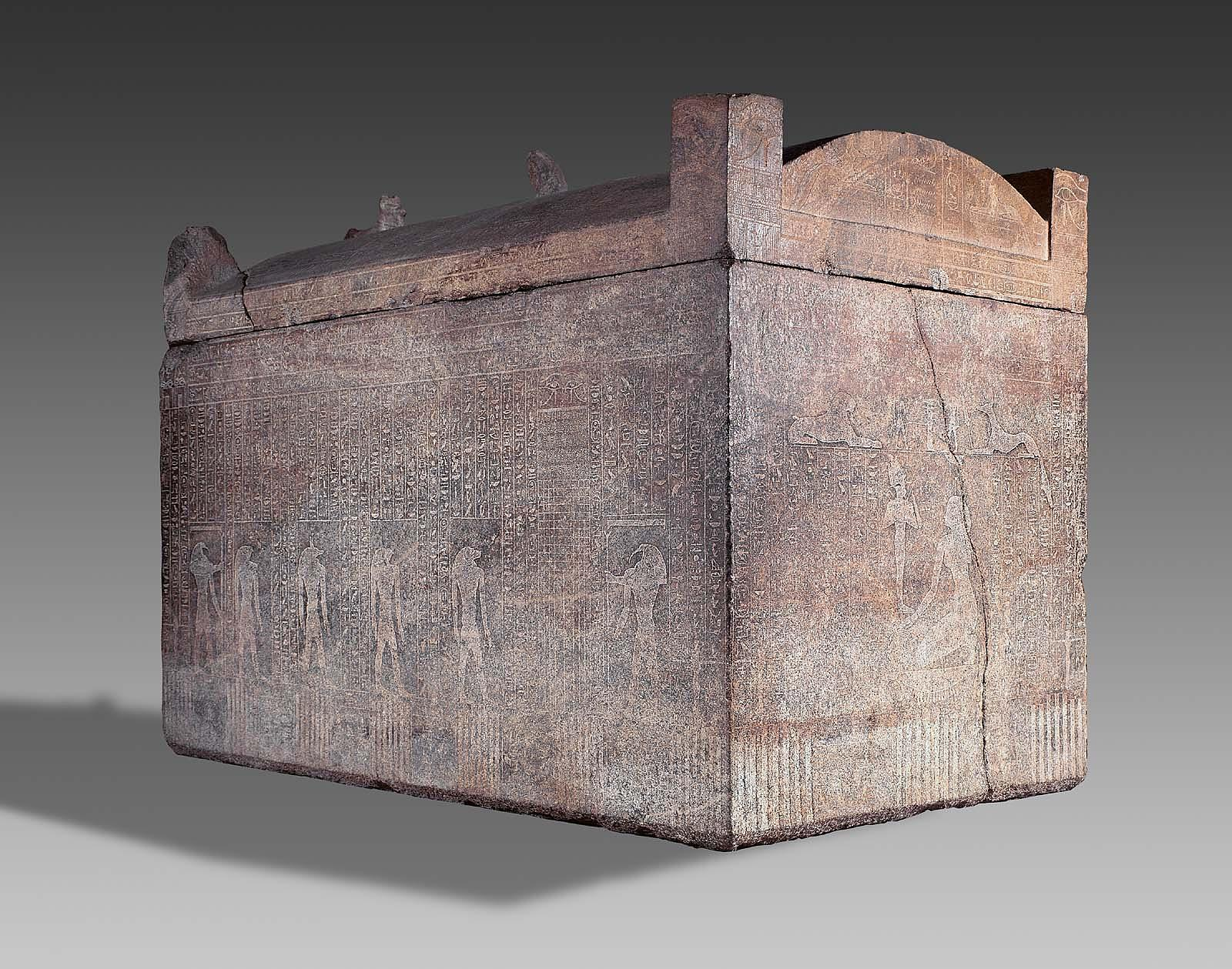
The Sarcophagus of King Aspelta found in Nuri pyramid 8. Museum of Fine Arts, Boston.

Preceded by Anlamani	Rulers of Kush	Succeeded by Aramatle-qo
