= Augustus =

Roman emperor from 27 BC to AD 14

- Princeps
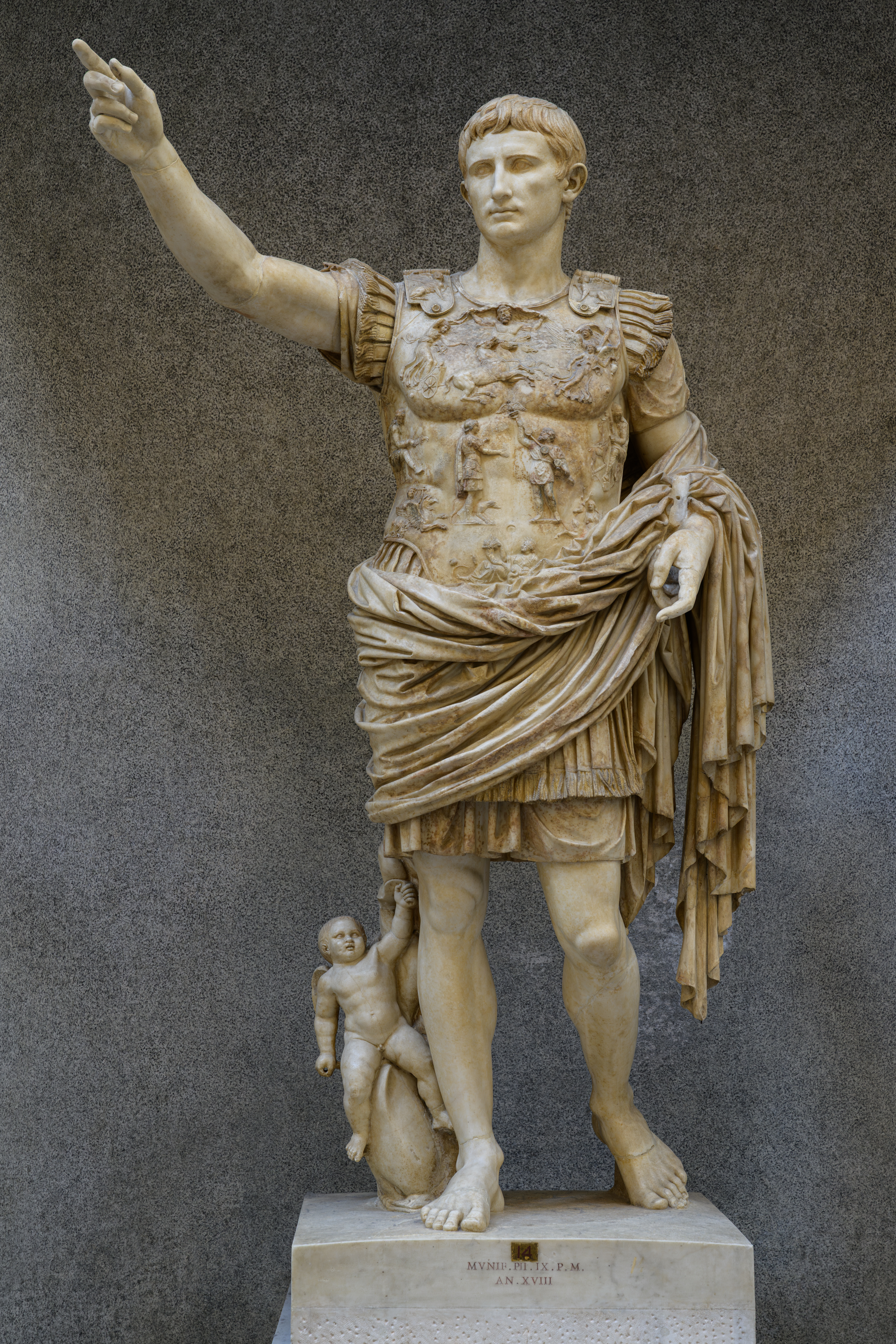
- The Augustus of Prima Porta

Roman emperor
- Reign: 16 January 27 BC – 19 August AD 14
- Successor: Tiberius
- Born: Gaius Octavius; 23 September 63 BC; Rome
- Died: 19 August AD 14 (aged 75); Nola, Roman Italy
- Burial: Mausoleum of Augustus, Rome
- Spouses: Claudia (m. 42 BC; div. 40 BC); Scribonia (m. 40 BC; div. 38 BC); Livia (m. 38 BC)
- Issue: Julia the Elder; Adopted: Gaius Caesar; Lucius Caesar; Agrippa Postumus; Tiberius
Regnal name
- Imperator Caesar Divi Filius Augustus
- Dynasty: Julio-Claudian
- Father: Gaius Octavius; Julius Caesar (adoptive)
- Mother: Atia
- Occupation: Consul (43, 33, 31–23, 5, 2 BC); Triumvir (43–27 BC); Pontifex Maximus (from 12 BC)

Military service
- Allegiance: Roman Republic; Roman Empire
- Years of service: 43–25 BC
- Battles/wars: War of Mutina; Battle of Forum Gallorum; Battle of Mutina; Liberators' Civil War; Battle of Philippi; Perusine War; Bellum Siculum; Battle of Tauromenium; Illyricum Campaigns; War of Actium; Battle of Actium; Battle of Alexandria; Cantabrian Wars

Augustus (born Gaius Octavius; 23 September 63 BC – 19 August AD 14), also known as Octavian (Latin: Octavianus), was the founder of the Roman Empire and the first Roman emperor from 27 BC until his death in AD 14. (Note: The dates of his rule are contemporary dates; Augustus lived under two calendars, the Roman Republican until 45 BC and the Julian after 45 BC. Due to departures from Julius Caesar's intentions, Augustus finished restoring the Julian calendar in March AD 4 and the correspondence between the proleptic Julian calendar and the calendar observed in Rome is uncertain before 8 BC.) The reign of Augustus initiated an imperial cult and an era of imperial peace (the Pax Romana or Pax Augusta) when the Roman world was largely free of armed conflict. The principate, a style of government in which the emperor showed nominal deference to the Senate, was established during his reign and lasted until the Crisis of the Third Century.

Octavian was born into an equestrian branch of the gens Octavia. His great-uncle, the Roman dictator Julius Caesar, named him as his primary heir in his will; after Caesar's assassination in 44 BC, Octavian inherited his estate and assumed his name. He fought for the loyalty of Caesar's legions. He was made a senator during a state emergency and seized power by marching on Rome in 43 BC, becoming its youngest elected consul. He, Mark Antony, and Marcus Lepidus formed a triumvirate regime with legally sanctioned powers to outlaw and oppose Caesar's assassins and their allies. Following their victory at the Battle of Philippi in 42 BC, the triumvirate divided the Roman Republic among themselves and ruled as de facto oligarchs. Competing ambitions eventually tore their alliance apart; Octavian had Lepidus exiled in 36 BC for opposing him in Sicily, while Marcus Agrippa, Octavian's naval commander, defeated Antony in Greece at the Battle of Actium in 31 BC. Antony and his wife Cleopatra, the Ptolemaic queen of Egypt, killed themselves during Octavian's invasion of Egypt, which then became Octavian's personal property.

After the demise of the triumvirate, Augustus reached an accord with the remaining Roman elite: he would restore the façade of a free republic, centered around the Senate, the executive magistrates and the legislative assemblies. But his control of the military and of half of Rome's provinces meant he maintained autocratic power legitimized by his appointment as commander-in-chief of most Roman armies. To avoid the appearance of monarchy or dictatorship, he eventually refused to stand for reelection to the consulship, but the Senate granted him the powers of the tribunate and censorship and the titles princeps ('first citizen'), augustus ('the revered'), and pater patriae (lit. 'father of the country'), and named the month of August after him. After Lepidus died, Augustus also became pontifex maximus ('supreme pontiff').

Augustus dramatically enlarged the Empire, annexing Egypt, Dalmatia, Pannonia, Noricum, and Raetia, expanding possessions in Africa, and completing the conquest of Hispania. His expansionism, however, suffered a major setback in Germania. Beyond the frontiers, he secured the empire with a buffer region of client states and negotiated peace treaties with the Parthian Empire and Kingdom of Kush. He reformed the Roman system of taxation and currency, developed networks of roads with an official courier system, established a standing professional army, established the Praetorian Guard as well as official police and fire-fighting services for the city of Rome, and renovated much of the city during his reign. Augustus was a writer and patron of poets such as Virgil, and has been featured in various works of art from ancient to modern times. He died in AD 14 at age 75 from natural causes, and the Senate posthumously deified him. Persistent rumors have claimed his wife Livia poisoned him. He was succeeded as emperor by his stepson and adoptive son Tiberius.

== Name ==
Augustus (/ɔːˈɡʌstəs/ aw-GUST-əs) was known by many names throughout his life:

- Gaius Octavius: (/ɒkˈteɪviəs/ ok-TAY-vee-əs; Latin: [ˈɡaːiʊs ɔkˈtaːwiʊs]). According to Suetonius, Octavius received the cognomen Thurinus (Latin: [tʰuːˈriːnʊs]) in his infancy to commemorate his father's victory over Spartacus's followers at Thurii. (Note: Cassius Dio instead gives him the name Caepias, probably a corruption of Scaptia, the name of Octavius' birth tribe.) Marcus Junius Brutus, the assassin of Octavian's adoptive father Julius Caesar, rejected Octavian's claim to testamentary adoption by Caesar by referring to him as Octavius.
- Gaius Julius Caesar: After Julius Caesar named Octavius his heir in 44 BC, Octavius took Caesar's nomen and cognomen. Historians often distinguished him from the late Caesar by adding Octavianus (Latin: [ɔktaːwiˈaːnʊs]) after the name, denoting that he was a former member of the gens Octavia. There is no evidence that Augustus did this himself, although some of his contemporaries called him Gaius Octavius, Gaius Julius Caesar Octavianus, or "young Caesar". Historians usually refer to him as Octavian (/ɒkˈteɪviən/ ok-TAY-vee-ən) for the period between 44 and 27 BC.
- Imperator Caesar: Octavian's early coins and inscriptions all refer to him as Gaius Caesar, but by 38 BC he had replaced Gaius with the victory title imperator ('commander'). His family line continued the use of the name Caesar, a cognomen for one branch of the Julian family, and eventually this formed a standard imperial title.
- Imperator Caesar Augustus: In 27 BC the Senate granted him the honorific Augustus (Latin: [au̯ˈɡʊstʊs]) ('the revered'). Historians use this name, or its converse Augustus Caesar, to refer to him from 27 BC until his death in AD 14.

== Early life ==
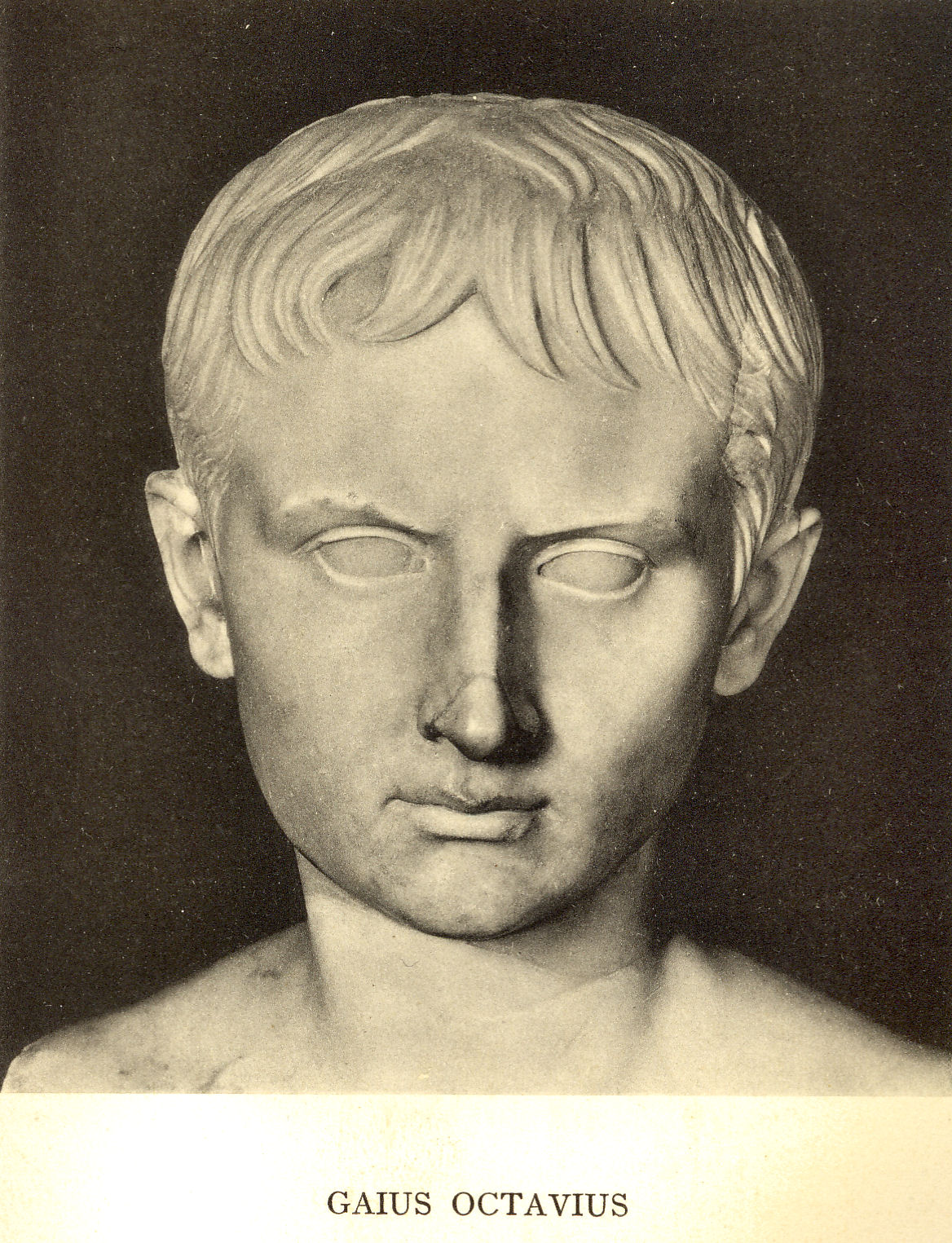
An idealized Roman sculpted portrait of Octavius as a teenager, possibly produced posthumously or when he was much older, now located in the Vatican Museums

Octavian was born Gaius Octavius in Rome on 23 September 63 BC, (Note: Historians Anne-Marie Lewis and Karl Galinsky explain the scholarly debate surrounding Octavius's precise date of birth. Evidence that it had occurred on 22 September is based on statements by historians such as Suetonius and Velleius Paterculus, though Cassius Dio affirms that it occurred on 23 September, and confusion also stems from the transition of using the early Republican Roman calendar to using the Julian calendar during Octavius's lifetime.) at a family property on the Palatine Hill. His father, Gaius Octavius, came from a moderately wealthy equestrian family of the gens Octavia. He ascended the cursus honorum and served as a proconsular governor of Macedonia. (Note: The elder Gaius Octavius was quaestor c. 73, aedile c. 64, and praetor in 61 BC. He was acclaimed as imperator for his victory over the Thracian Bessi tribe that invaded during his proconsular governorship over Macedonia.) His family was from Velitrae, near Rome, where his son spent part of his childhood. The younger Octavius's mother, Atia, was a niece of Julius Caesar.

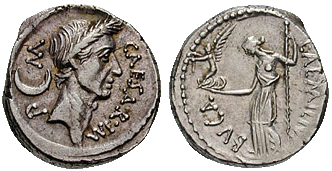
Denarius from 44 BC, showing Julius Caesar on the obverse and the goddess Venus on the reverse of the coin. Caption: CAESAR IMP. M. / L. AEMILIVS BVCA

After Octavius's father died in 59 BC or 58 BC, his mother married Lucius Marcius Philippus, who was elected as consul in 56 BC. When Octavius's grandmother Julia, sister of Julius Caesar, died in 52 or 51 BC, Octavius delivered her funeral oration, his first public appearance. A Greek slave tutor named Sphaerus educated him in reading, writing, arithmetic, and Greek. Octavius later freed Sphaerus and gave him a state funeral in 40 BC. As a teenager, he studied philosophy under Areios of Alexandria and Athenodorus of Tarsus, Latin rhetoric under Marcus Epidius, and Greek rhetoric under Apollodorus of Pergamon.

Julius Caesar had formed an informal alliance with Pompey and Crassus in 60 BC, but by 49 BC it had fallen apart and Pompey and Caesar were fighting a protracted civil war. In 47 BC, after Octavius donned the toga virilis and became an adult citizen, Caesar had him elected as pontiff, replacing the slain Lucius Ahenobarbus. The following year, Octavius presided over the Greek games commemorating the opening of Caesar's Temple of Venus Genetrix. He wished to join Caesar's staff for the African campaign but gave way when his mother Atia protested over his poor health, although afterward Caesar allowed Octavius to proceed next to his chariot during his triumph and awarded Octavius with military decorations as if he had been present. In 45 BC Octavius traveled to Hispania to join Caesar's Spanish campaign against Pompey the Younger. On 13 September 45 BC Caesar deposited a new will with the Vestal Virgins naming Octavius as his principal heir. (Note: Octavius was not appointed magister equitum, contra Theodor Mommsen. The title may stem from conflation in Greek between the magister equitum and praefectus urbi.)

== Rise to power ==
=== Heir to Caesar ===
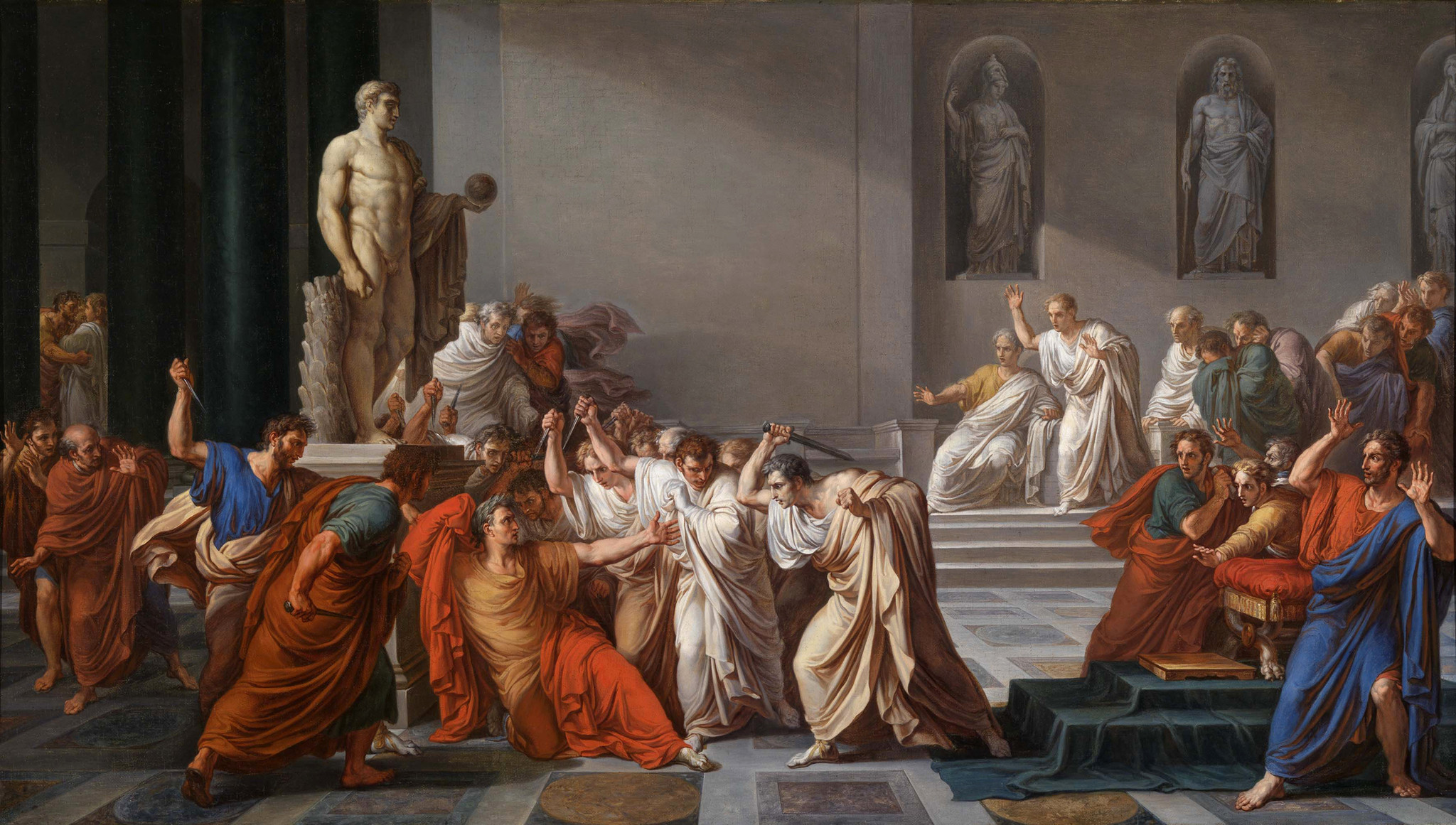
The Death of Caesar by Vincenzo Camuccini, 1805, Galleria Nazionale d'Arte Moderna, Rome

In 44 BC, Octavius was at Apollonia, Illyria, when Julius Caesar was made Rome's first dictator perpetuo ('dictator in perpetuity') in February, and then assassinated on the Ides of March (15 March). Octavius consulted Caesar's officers in Macedonia before sailing for Italy to ascertain his political fortunes. Caesar had no living legitimate children under Roman law. His will made Octavius his main heir with the condition that he assume Caesar's name. After landing near Brundisium in southern Italy, Octavius received a copy of the will, which bequeathed him three-quarters of Caesar's estate. (Note: Quintus Pedius and Lucius Pinarius were the remaining heirs, likely the children of Caesar's elder sister. Contra Nicolaus Damascenus, 8.17–18, Octavian was not adopted by Caesar during the latter's life.) Against the advice of his stepfather Philippus, Octavius accepted Caesar's will on 8 May 44 BC. He purported that Caesar adopted him as his son and assumed the name Gaius Julius Caesar. His stepfather, Cicero, and other contemporaries referred to him as Octavianus.

Octavian lacked adequate funds to establish a political career. After a warm welcome by Caesar's soldiers at Brundisium, he demanded a portion of the funds allotted by Caesar for his eastern war against the Parthians. This amounted to 700 million sesterces stored at Brundisium, the staging ground in Italy for military operations in the east. (Note: A later senatorial investigation into the disappearance of the public funds took no action against Octavian since he then used that money to raise troops against the Senate's enemy Mark Antony.) Octavian made another bold move when, without official permission, he appropriated the annual tribute from Rome's province of Asia to Italy. He also recruited Caesar's veterans and men designated for the Parthian war. On his march to Rome, Octavian's new wealth won him new supporters, including veterans. By June, he had gathered an army of 3,000 men, paying each a bonus of 500 denarii, which was more than twice a soldier's annual pay.

=== Growing tensions ===
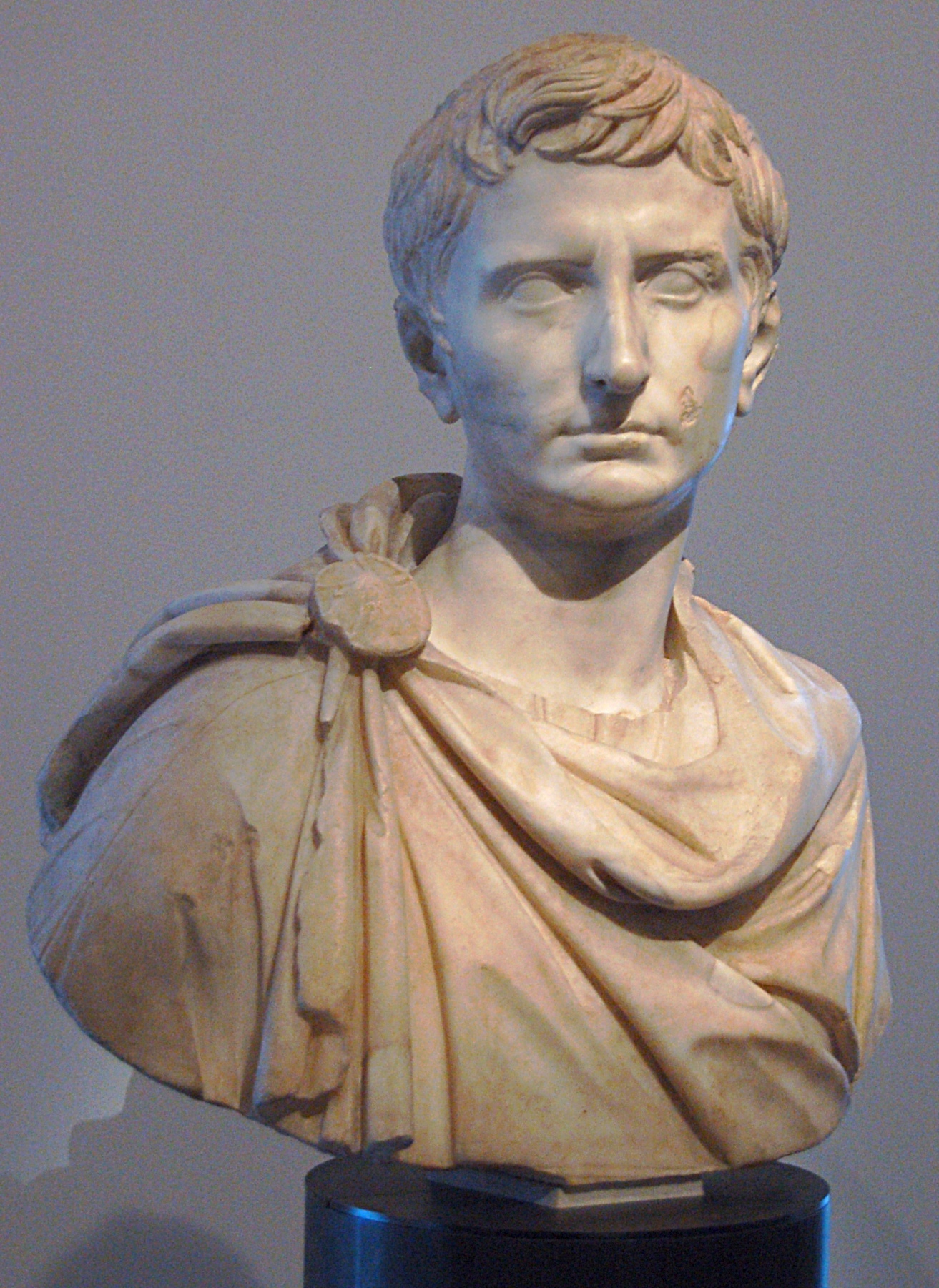
Bust of Octavian, c. 30 BC. Capitoline Museums, Rome

Arriving in Rome on 6 May 44 BC, Octavian found consul Mark Antony, Caesar's former colleague, in an uneasy truce with Caesar's assassins. A general amnesty on 17 March pardoned the assassins in exchange for recognition of Caesar's legal acts. Soon afterwards, Antony succeeded in driving most of them out of Rome with an inflammatory eulogy at Caesar's funeral, mounting public opinion against the assassins.

Mark Antony amassed political support, but had lost the support of many Romans and Caesarians when he opposed the motion to elevate Caesar to divine status. Octavian challenged him as the leader of the Caesarians. Antony withheld Octavian's inheritance from Caesar to halt him from granting the 300 sesterces per capita to the urban plebs stipulated in Caesar's will. He also blocked the curiate assembly from hearing Octavian's attempts to legitimize his supposed adoption by Caesar, to have Caesar formally deified and to reinstate Caesar's golden throne for public view at games staged in April and June. During Caesar's victory games, Octavian distributed some of the funds in Caesar's will and combined this with his own money, enhancing his popularity while damaging Antony's.

During the summer of 44 BC, more veterans and also senators took Octavian's side, viewing Antony as a threat to the state. Antony had lictors drag Octavian away from a hearing over the reinstatement of private property seized by Caesar in 49 BC. Octavian then claimed Antony threatened his life as retribution for distributing money to the plebs in Caesar's will. Caesar's veterans convinced Antony to publicly reconcile with Octavian in the Temple of Jupiter Optimus Maximus. Thereafter, Antony's bellicose edicts against the assassins Marcus Junius Brutus and Gaius Cassius Longinus alienated him from the moderate Caesarian senators, who feared a renewed civil war. In September, Marcus Tullius Cicero, now a political ally of Octavian, began to give a series of speeches portraying Antony as a threat to the Republic.

=== First conflict with Antony ===
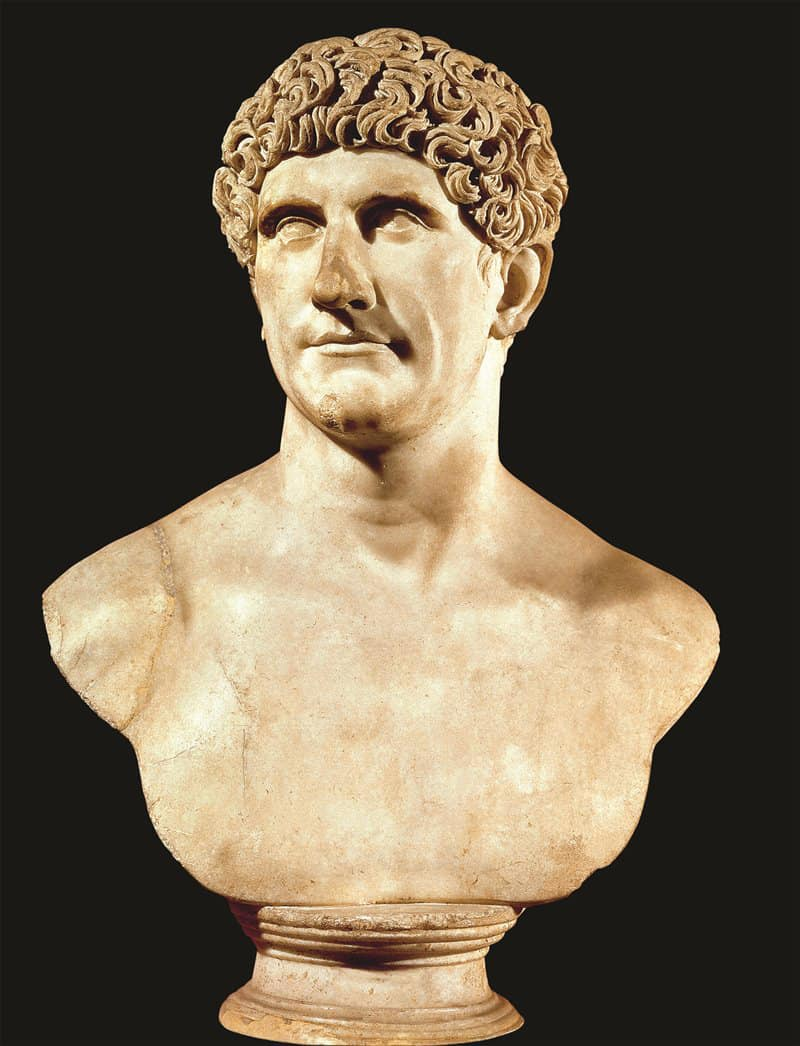
Flavian-era bust traditionally identified as Mark Antony, Vatican Museums

With opinion in Rome turning against him and his consulship concluding, Antony illegally took control of the province of Cisalpine Gaul in northern Italy. Octavian meanwhile built up a private army in Italy by recruiting Caesarian veterans, and in early November entered Rome with this private force to challenge Antony. However, they left Rome shortly afterwards, as some veterans refused to involve themselves in a Caesarian squabble rather than a revenge campaign against Caesar's assassins. Nevertheless, on 28 November, Octavian won over two of Antony's legions with the enticing offer of monetary gain. Antony then left Rome for Cisalpine Gaul, which was to be handed to him on 1 January 43 BC. However, the province had earlier been assigned to the assassin Decimus Junius Brutus Albinus, who now refused to yield to Antony. Antony besieged him at Mutina. This provided an opportunity for Octavian, whose private army was at hand.

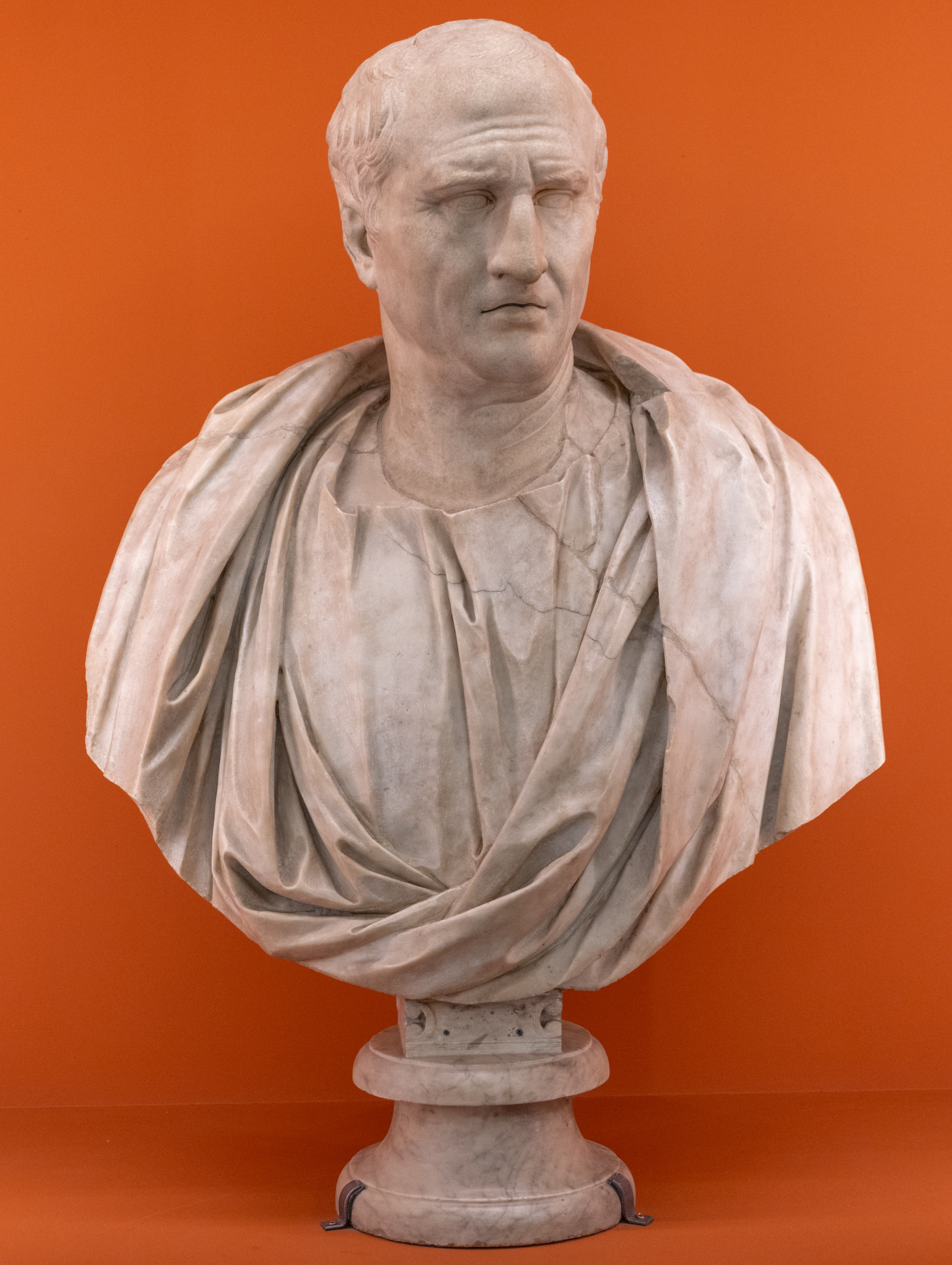
Bust of Marcus Tullius Cicero, 1st century AD, Capitoline Museums, Rome

Cicero defended Octavian against Antony's taunts, (Note: Defending Octavian against Mark Antony's taunts about Octavian's lack of noble lineage and aping of Julius Caesar's name, Marcus Tullius Cicero stated "we have no more brilliant example of traditional piety among our youth".) and had him inducted as a senator on 1 January 43 BC. Octavian was given the power to vote alongside the former consuls, the privilege to stand for election at an earlier age than usual, and imperium pro praetore which legitimized his command. Octavian accompanied the current consuls to relieve the siege of Mutina. He assumed the fasces on 7 January, a date that he would later commemorate as the beginning of his public career. Antony retreated to Transalpine Gaul after his forces were defeated at the battles of Forum Gallorum and Mutina in April. The consuls were killed, however, leaving Octavian in sole command of their armies. These victories earned him his first acclamation as imperator, a victorious commander.

Largely ignoring Octavian, the Senate heaped many rewards on Decimus Brutus and attempted to give him command of the consular legions. In response, Octavian stayed in the Po Valley and refused to pursue Antony. In July, an embassy of centurions sent by Octavian entered Rome; they demanded the now-vacant consulship for Octavian, with Cicero as co-consul, and the rescission of the decree declaring Antony a public enemy. When this was refused, Octavian marched on Rome, where he encountered no military opposition. On 19 August 43 BC, aged 19, he became consul alongside his relative Quintus Pedius. Pedius passed legislation creating a special tribunal for Caesar's assassins and their alleged associates; Octavian presided over the trial and had them convicted and exiled in absentia. (Note: Men such as Sextus Pompey not present in the city were also convicted, even if they had nothing to do with the assassination.) Octavian also induced the curiate assembly to have him adrogated into Caesar's family, legitimizing his claim of testamentary adoption. Meanwhile, Antony formed an alliance with Marcus Aemilius Lepidus, then governor of Gallia Narbonensis. The Senate branded Lepidus, a fellow Caesarian, as a public enemy for joining Antony, but they reversed the pair's outlawing at Pedius's behest while Octavian marched north to fight Decimus Brutus and meet with Antony.

=== Second Triumvirate ===
In a meeting near Bononia in October 43 BC, Octavian, Antony, and Lepidus joined to form the triumvirate, ostensibly for the stability of the Roman Republic, and on 27 November the lex Titia legitimized their agreement for five years. The triumvirate gave the men consular power, the right to appoint magistrates, and allowed their division among themselves of the provinces not controlled by the liberatores in the east. Octavian had previously been engaged to Servilia, daughter of Servilius Isauricus, but instead became engaged to Antony's stepdaughter Claudia to solidify their political union. Octavian also relinquished the consulship to Antony's ally Publius Ventidius.

==== Proscriptions ====
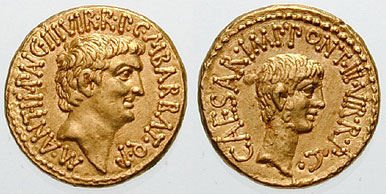
Aureus bearing the portraits of Mark Antony (left) and Octavian (right), issued in 41 BC to celebrate the establishment of the Second Triumvirate. Both sides bear the inscription III vir rpc, meaning 'Three Men for the regulation of the Republic'. Caption: m ant imp aug (Note: aug refers to the religious office of augur, not the title augustus created in 27 BC.) iiivir rpc m barbat (Note: Marcus Barbatius was a moneyer.) q p / caesar imp pont iiivir rpc.

The triumvirs then introduced proscriptions outlawing some 300 men, divided roughly evenly between senators and equestrians. Thousands more had their properties confiscated. (Note: Ancient sources differ considerably as to how many men were targeted. Hinard 1985, pp. 266–269, reviews the evidence. Plutarch in three different lives – Brutus (27.6), Cicero (46.2), and Antony (20.2) – gives figures of 200, a bit more than 200, and 300 men, respectively. Livy, Periochae, 120.4, gave only 130 senators and many equites besides. Florus, 2.16.3, gave 140 senators. Appian, Bella Civilia, 4.7, gives 17 names at first before, in two rounds, 130 and 150 others were added. Appian, Bella Civilia, 4.5.7, also gives a total of 300 senators and some 2,000 equites, but this figure describes all persons who were killed or had properties confiscated between 43 and the treaty of Misenum in 39. The number of victims was not necessarily the number proscribed; figures given in Orosius (6.18.10) are corrupt. Around 160 of the proscribed are known by name.) Contemporary Roman historians disagree about which triumvir was most responsible for the proscriptions and killing, but agree that all three used them to eliminate political enemies. (Note: Velleius Paterculus asserted that Octavian tried to avoid proscribing officials whereas Lepidus and Antony were to blame for initiating them. Cassius Dio defended Octavian as trying to spare as many as possible, whereas Antony and Lepidus, being older and involved in politics longer, had many more enemies to deal with. This claim was rejected by Appian, who maintained that Octavian shared an equal interest with Lepidus and Antony in eradicating his enemies. Suetonius said that Octavian was reluctant at first to proscribe officials but did pursue his enemies with more vigor than the other triumvirs. Plutarch described the proscriptions as a ruthless and cutthroat swapping of friends and family among the triumvirs, with Octavian allowing the proscription of his ally Cicero, Antony the proscription of his uncle Lucius Julius Caesar (the consul for 64 BC), and Lepidus his brother Paullus. Plutarch insisted that Octavian initially defended Cicero but gave way to Antony, but Octavian may also have sought Cicero's death.)

The triumvirs used the proscriptions partly to finance their campaign against Caesar's assassins Marcus Brutus and Gaius Cassius, but mainly to eliminate wartime rivals. However much money the triumvirs obtained from the proscripts was insufficient, so they introduced various new taxes to fund their war. They reinstituted property taxes and created new imposts on slaves, before also demanding property assessments for taxes on rich women that were reduced after a public protest of women in Rome.

==== Battle of Philippi and division of territory ====
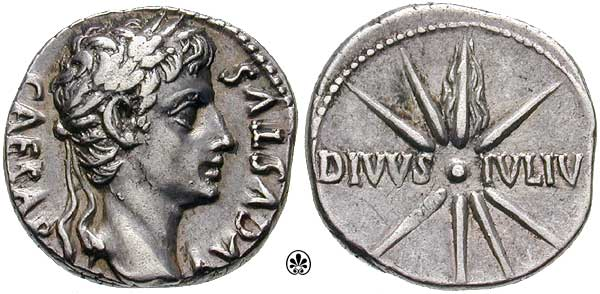
A denarius coin of Augustus minted c. 18 BC. Obverse: CAESAR AVGVSTVS; reverse: Caesar's comet with eight rays and an upward tail; DIVVS IVLIV[S], "divine Julius".

On 1 January 42 BC, the Senate posthumously recognized Julius Caesar as a divinity of the Roman state, divus Iulius. Octavian furthered his cause by emphasizing that he was divi filius ('son of the divine'). Antony and Octavian then led twenty-eight legions east against Brutus and Cassius, whom they defeated after two battles at Philippi in Macedonia in October 42 BC. Brutus and Cassius both died by suicide. Claiming responsibility for both victories, Antony branded Octavian a coward for handing over his direct military control to Marcus Vipsanius Agrippa. Octavian was bedridden with illness during the first battle, allegedly removing himself from command over the camp per his doctor's advice, but captured Brutus's camp during the second battle.

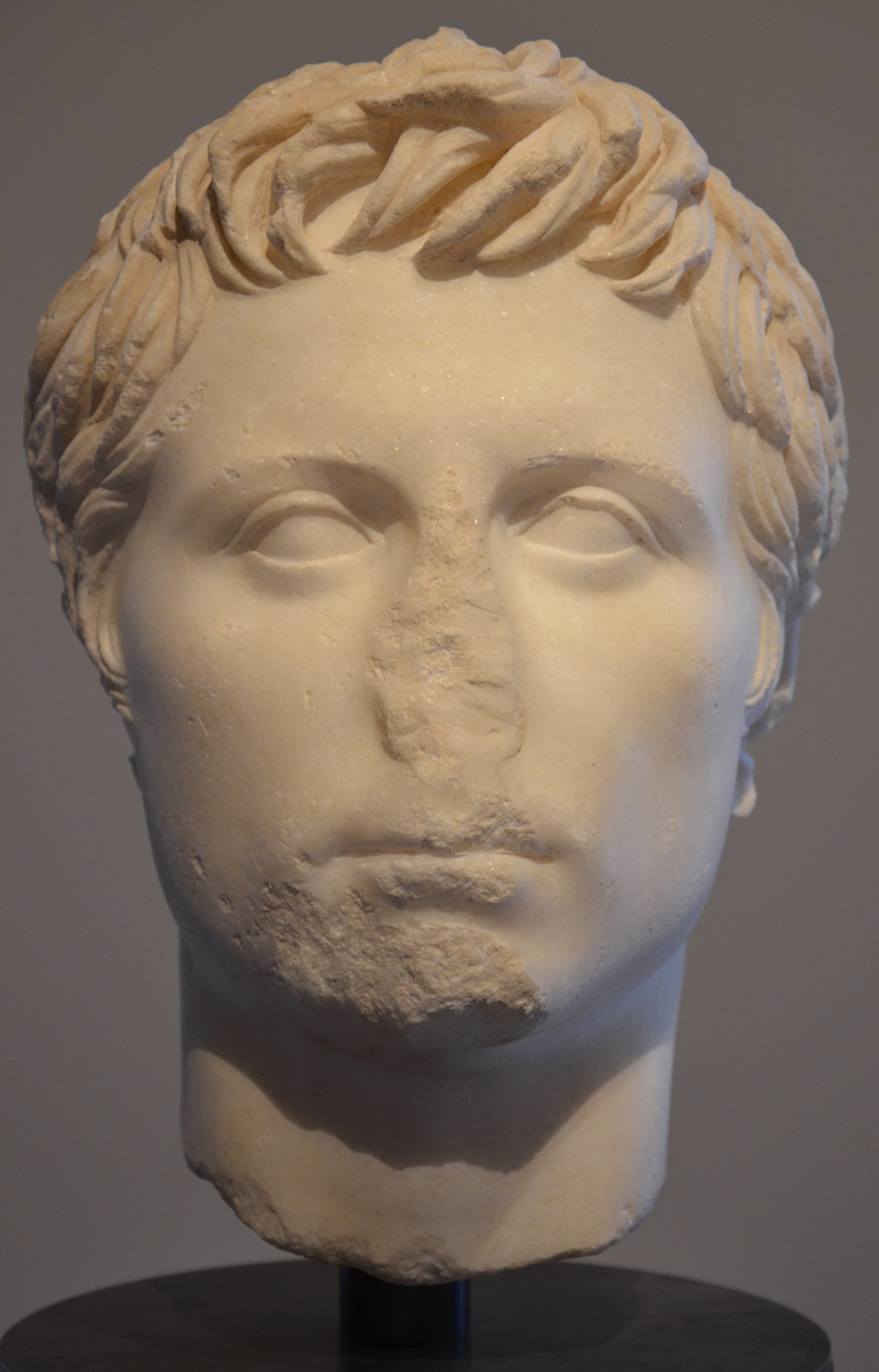
Sculpted marble head of Octavian dated to around the Battle of Philippi (42 BC), Archaeological Museum of Spoleto

After Philippi, the triumvirs again divided the provinces. Lepidus was suspected of colluding with Sextus Pompey, the renegade general whom the anti-Caesarian Senate had given command over all Mediterranean coastlines in 43 BC. (Note: Ratified on 20 March 43 BC, the Senate bestowed Sextus Pompey with the office of praefectus classis et orae maritimae for the Roman navy, granting him control over all coastal areas of the Mediterranean Sea.) Cisalpine Gaul was combined with Italia and given to Octavian along with the provinces of Hispania Citerior and Hispania Ulterior that Lepidus had to forfeit. Antony travelled east to Egypt where he allied himself with Cleopatra, a Roman client ruler, former lover of Julius Caesar, and mother of Caesar's son Caesarion. In addition to the eastern provinces, Antony controlled Gallia Comata and took Gallia Narbonensis from Lepidus, who was left with the province of Africa.

Octavian had to settle tens of thousands of discharged veterans in Italy. Those who fought for the assassins also required settlement for their pacification. With no remaining public land, Octavian chose to confiscate land from citizens, instead of alienating the soldiers who could mount a real threat to the regime in Italy. The settlements affected some eighteen cities, with entire populations fully or partially evicted.

==== Perusine War, marriage alliances, and Brundisium ====
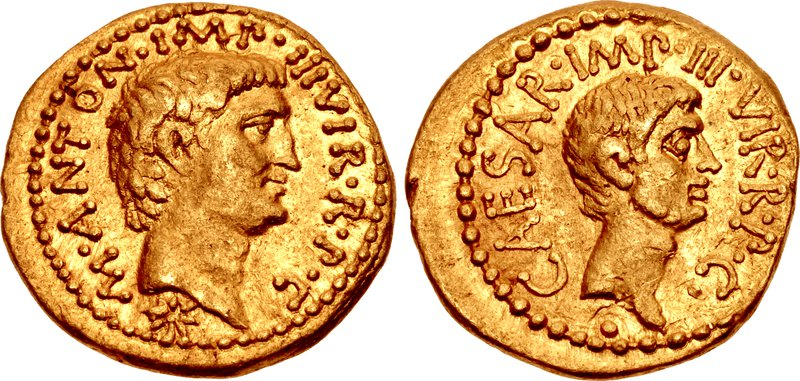
Roman aureus bearing the portraits of Mark Antony (left) and Octavian (right), issued to celebrate their reconciliation in October 40 BC

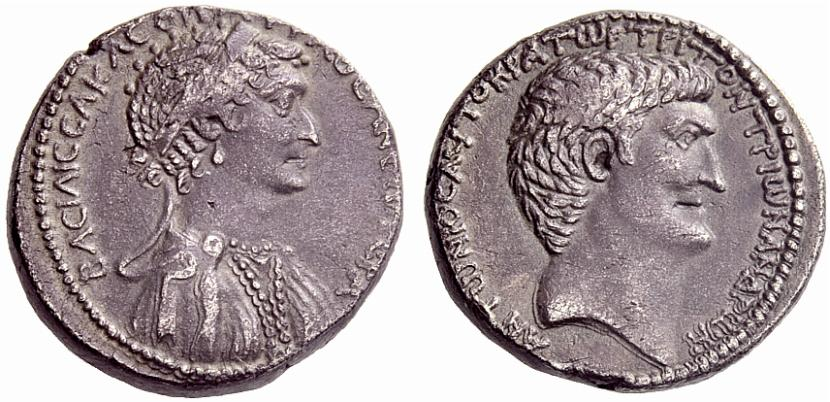
Cleopatra and Mark Antony on the obverse and reverse, respectively, of a silver tetradrachm struck at the mint of Antioch in 36 BC, with Greek legends

Many who opposed Octavian's veteran settlements rallied to Mark Antony's brother Lucius Antonius, who had high support in the Senate. Meanwhile, Octavian asked for a divorce from Claudia, Antony's stepdaughter. He returned Claudia to her mother, Fulvia, claiming that their marriage had never been consummated. Fulvia and Lucius Antonius then raised an army in Italy to fight for Antony's rights against Octavian. Lucius even briefly took Rome, forcing Lepidus and his two legions to flee the city. However, the Roman army still depended on the triumvirs for their salaries. Lucius and his allies ended up in a defensive siege at Perusia, where Octavian forced their surrender in February 40 BC. Octavian spared Lucius, while Fulvia fled to Sicyon in Greece and died shortly afterwards. On 15 March, the anniversary of Julius Caesar's assassination, Octavian had 300 Roman senators and equestrians executed for allying with Lucius. (Note: Historian Adrian Goldsworthy downplays this event as a potential exaggeration due to rumors and legend preserved in primary sources: "Rumour and hostile propaganda soon turned this into another ghastly massacre, with 300 leading citizens being sacrificed to Julius Caesar's spirit – an invention no doubt inspired by Achilles' killing of Trojan prisoners at the funeral of his comrade Patroclus in the Iliad. Suetonius claims that pleas for mercy and excuses were met by the young triumvir with a laconic 'He must die' or 'You must die' – moriendum esse in Latin. Yet on the whole reprisals were limited. The rebel soldiers were spared, and many no doubt were recruited into Caesar's legions. Lucius Antonius was not only left unharmed, but was sent to govern one of the Spanish provinces".) Perusia was also sacked, though it is unclear who started the fires. These reprisals sullied Octavian's reputation.

A Roman bust of Livia, Augustus's third wife, Musée Saint-Raymond, France

Sextus Pompey affirmed his control of Sicily as part of an agreement with the triumvirate in 40 BC, and gained control of Sardinia and Corsica in 39. Both Antony and Octavian sought an alliance with him. Octavian established a temporary alliance in 40 BC when he married Scribonia, an aunt of Sextus's wife. A year later, Octavian divorced Scribonia on the same day she gave birth to his only surviving child, Julia; he then married Livia Drusilla. When Livia began her affair with Octavian, she was already married to Tiberius Claudius Nero, had a son Tiberius with Nero, and was pregnant with their second child. She gave birth to her second son, Drusus, several months after her divorce from Nero and marriage to Octavian. Livia later had another child with Octavian, who was born prematurely and did not survive.

While in Egypt, Antony had engaged in an affair with Cleopatra and had fathered three children with her. (Note: Mark Antony's children with Cleopatra were the twins Alexander Helios and Cleopatra Selene II born in 40 BC, and their son Ptolemy Philadelphus born in 36 BC.) Antony's Gallic provinces fell into Octavian's hands after the death of Antony's legate Quintus Calenus in 40 BC. Aware of his deteriorating relationship with Octavian, Antony left Cleopatra; he sailed to Italy in 40 BC with a large force to oppose Octavian, laying siege to Brundisium, but the men's revolting armies forced them to reconcile. In late 40, the triumvirs divided the empire between Antony in the east, Octavian in the west, and Lepidus in Africa. (Note: Italy was left open to all for the recruitment of soldiers, but in reality this provision was useless for Antony.) Strengthened by the Parthian threat in Antony's provinces, Octavian gave his sister, Octavia Minor, in marriage to Antony.

==== War with Sextus Pompey and exile of Lepidus ====
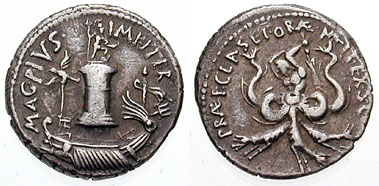
A denarius of Sextus Pompey, minted for his victory over Octavian's fleet. Obverse: the place where he defeated Octavian, Pharus of Messina decorated with a statue of Neptune; before that galley adorned with aquila, sceptre & trident; MAG. PIVS IMP. ITER. Reverse, the monster Scylla, her torso of dogs and fish tails, wielding a rudder as a club. Caption: PRAEF[ECTUS] CLAS[SIS] ET ORAE MARIT[IMAE] EX S. C.

Before the battles of Philippi, Octavian had sent Salvidienus Rufus to remove Sextus Pompey from Sicily, but after Rufus's defeat, the triumvirs recognized Sextus's Mediterranean command at Brundisium in 40 BC. When Sextus resumed his blockade, a starving angry mob in Rome blamed Octavian and Antony and attacked them in early 39 BC; Antony's forces rescued Octavian and dispersed the mob. Another temporary peace agreement was reached in 39 BC at Misenum. Sextus lifted the blockade on Italy once Octavian granted him Sardinia, Corsica, Sicily, and the Peloponnese and ensured him a future position in the consulship. (Note: According to Patricia Southern, other stipulations of the Treaty of Misenum included Sextus Pompey's position as consul designate for 38 BC (with Mark Antony assigned as consul for the same year), being allowed to join the college of augurs, and being made responsible for maintaining Rome's grain supply, but that he was not allowed to station any of his troops in Roman Italy. According to Klaus Bringmann, Sextus Pompey was guaranteed the consulship for 35 BC, and was made responsible for managing the grain supply to Rome. Both Southern and Bringmann relate how various proscribed republican liberatores were given amnesty and allowed to return to Rome. Citing Appian (BCiv 5.73), historian Kathryn Welch states that Sextus Pompey was consul designate with Octavian for 33 BC. Historian Adrian Goldsworthy agrees the claims about Sicily, Sardinia, Corsica, the Peloponnese, and the college of augurs, but says that "Pompey's son was scheduled to be consul in 33 BC in elections controlled by the triumvirate".)

The agreement between the triumvirate and Sextus began to crumble when Octavian divorced Scribonia and married Livia in 38 BC. After Antony refused to relinquish the Peloponnese, Sextus reimposed his blockade, starting food riots at Rome. Sextus's naval commander Menas defected, handing over Corsica and Sardinia. However, after Octavian's naval forces were defeated at Cumae, Octavian lacked the resources to confront Sextus alone, so he sought Antony's help, extending their terms for another five-year period beginning in 37 BC.

In supporting Octavian, Antony expected to gain support for his own campaign against the Parthians. At Tarentum in mid-37 BC, Antony provided 120 ships for Octavian to use against Sextus, while Octavian was to send 20,000 legionaries to Antony for use against Parthia. Two years later Octavian sent only a tenth of those promised, which Antony viewed as a provocation. Meanwhile, Octavian tasked Marcus Agrippa with creating the artificial harbor Portus Julius for the training and shipbuilding of Octavian's naval fleet.

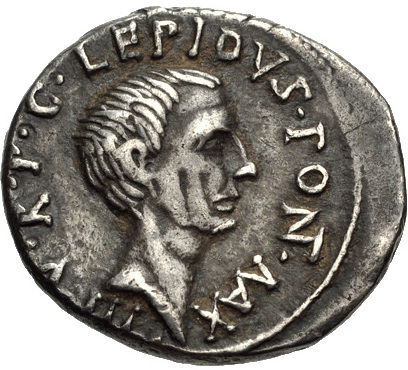
Denarius of 42 BC depicting Marcus Aemilius Lepidus; the inscription reads III v(ir) r(ei) p(ublicae) c(onstituendae) Lepidus pont(ifex) max(imus) ('Triumvir for the regulation of the republic, Lepidus, Pontifex maximus').

Octavian and Lepidus launched a joint operation against Sextus in Sicily in 36 BC. Octavian was shipwrecked in Sicily, but Agrippa defeated Sextus at Mylae in August before almost destroying Sextus's forces at Naulochus in September. Sextus fled to the east, but Antony had him executed at Miletus in 35 BC.

As Lepidus and Octavian accepted the surrender of Sextus's troops, Lepidus attempted to claim Sicily for himself. However, Lepidus's troops deserted him after Octavian bribed them. Octavian forced Lepidus into retirement but allowed him to remain pontifex maximus ('supreme pontiff'). Octavian protected Roman citizens' rights to property, settled his discharged soldiers outside Italy, and returned 30,000 slaves to their former Roman owners after they had fled to join Sextus's army and navy. To ensure his family's safety once he returned to Rome, he had the Senate grant him, his wife, and his sister tribunician immunity, or sacrosanctitas.

After defeating Sextus, Octavian campaigned in Illyricum (in what is now Croatia). During the first campaign in 35 BC he destroyed Segesta (modern Siscia) and was wounded by a collapsing siege ramp when he besieged Metulum (along the Kolpa River). The Senate lauded these efforts, though Octavian postponed a triumph for his victories, and only later acknowledged the contributions of commanders Agrippa and Statilius Taurus. (Note: Nevertheless both Octavian and Antony's generals celebrated triumphs during the 30s BC. For instance, Statilius Taurus celebrated a triumph in 34 BC and later built Rome's first fully stone amphitheater. Antony's general Publius Ventidius was granted a triumph for defending Roman Syria in 38 BC against the invasion of Pacorus I of Parthia.)

==== War with Antony and Cleopatra ====
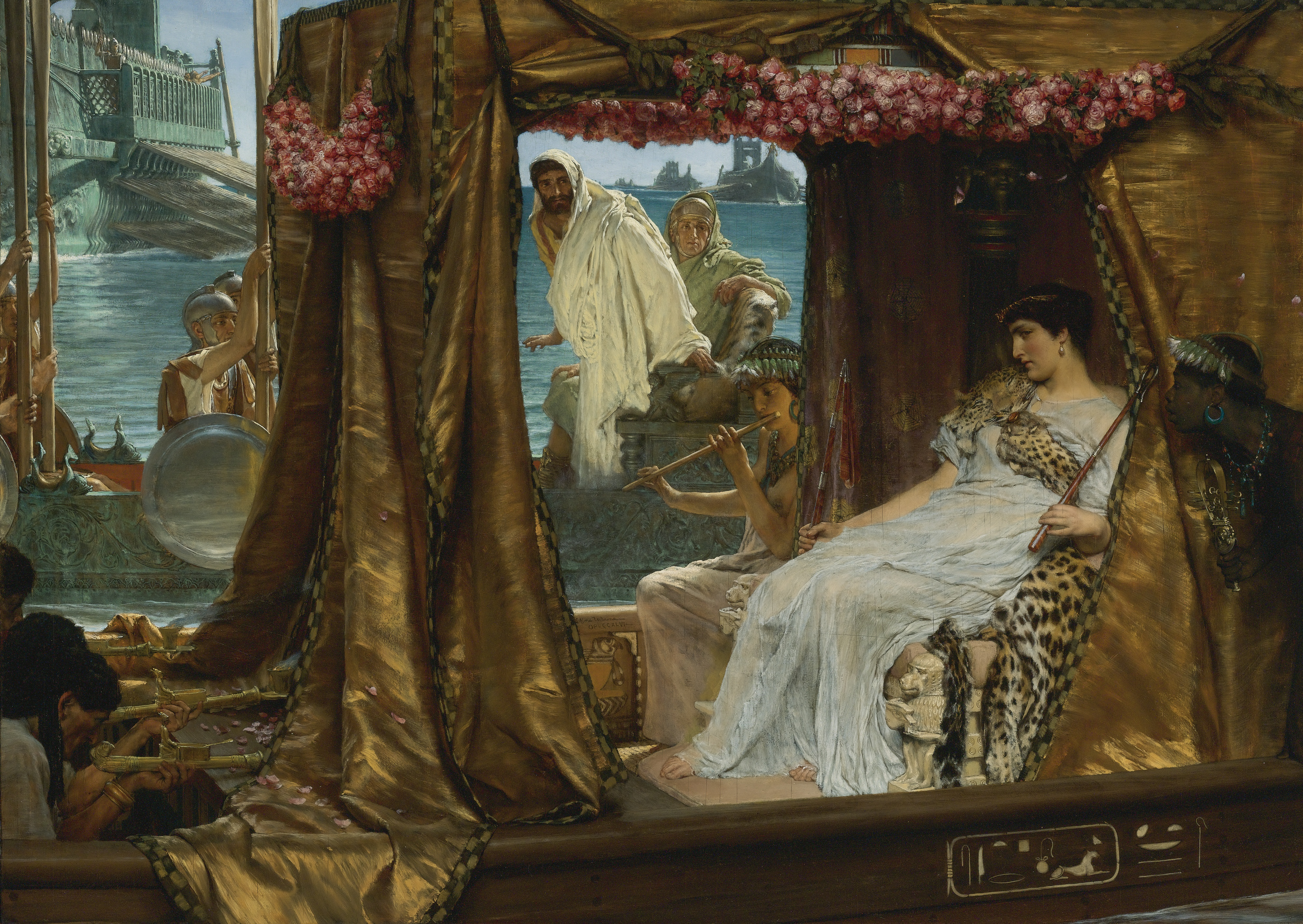
Antony and Cleopatra, by Lawrence Alma-Tadema, painted 1885

In 36 BC, Octavian declared the civil wars at an end and suggested that he and Antony resign as triumvirs; Antony refused. Antony's Parthian campaign in 36 BC turned into a debacle and ruined his reputation. The mere 2,000 legionaries sent by Octavian to Antony, traveling with his wife Octavia, were hardly enough to replenish his lost forces. On the other hand, Cleopatra, with her enormous wealth, could restore his army to full strength. Her and Antony's third child, Ptolemy Philadelphus, was born in 36 BC, so in 35 BC Antony decided to send Octavia back to Rome. Octavian attacked Antony for rejecting his Roman spouse for a foreign queen. He also sought to convince the Senate that Antony had ambitions to diminish the preeminence of Rome. When Octavian assumed the consulship of 33 BC, he opened the Senate with a vehement attack on Antony's grants of titles and territories to his relatives and Cleopatra, later known as the Donations of Alexandria.

In early 32 BC, amid an intense war of propaganda with Octavian, Antony divorced Octavia. The new consuls Gaius Sosius and Gnaeus Ahenobarbus supported Antony and threatened to revoke Octavian's triumviral authority. This prompted Octavian to enter the Senate house and denounce Antony and Sosius; both consuls and many senators then fled Rome for Antony. However, Antony's key supporters Munatius Plancus and Marcus Titius defected to Octavian in autumn, offering him vital information about Antony's will. The will designated Roman-conquered territories as kingdoms for his sons to rule and designated Alexandria as the site of a tomb for him and Cleopatra.

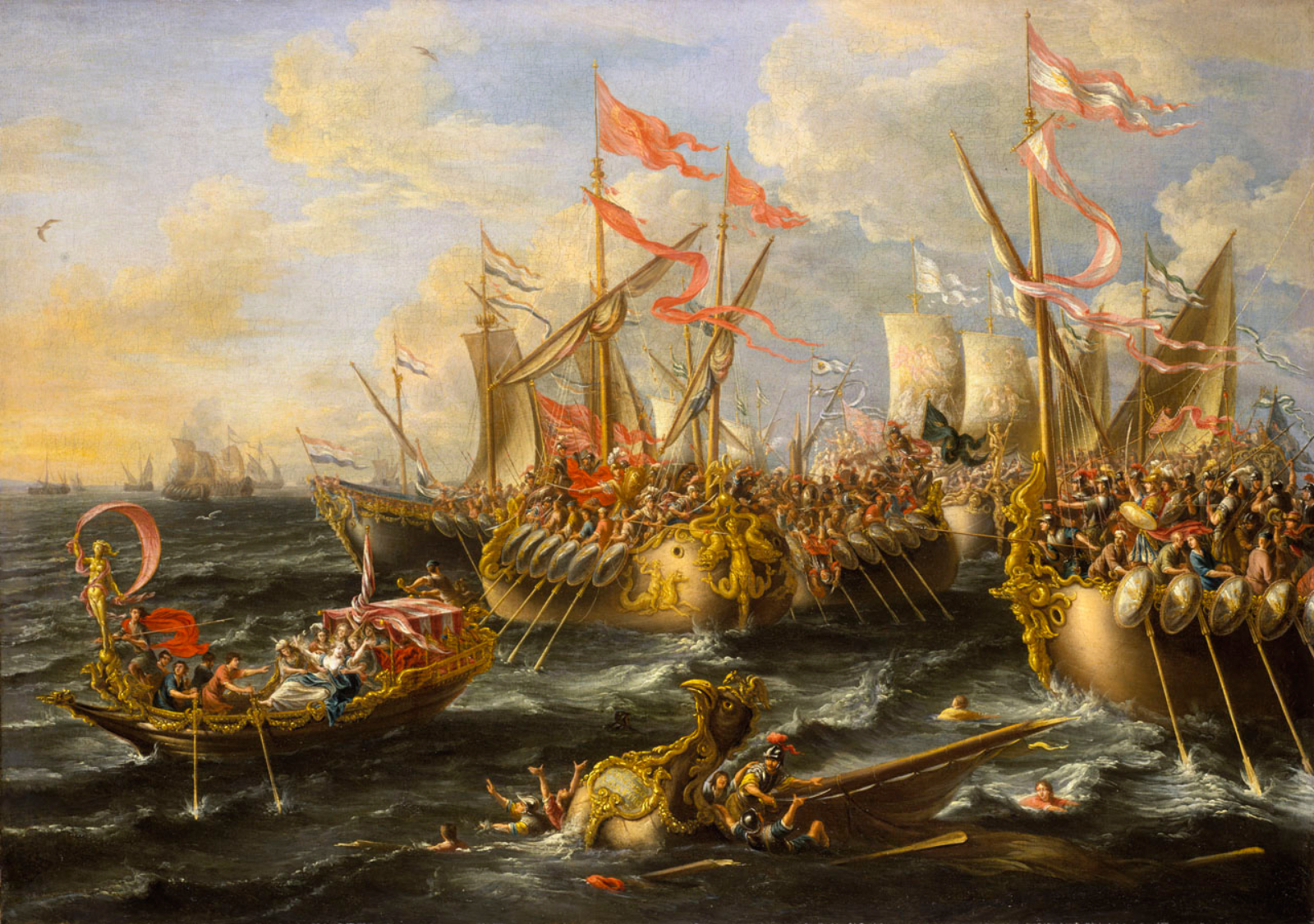
The Battle of Actium, by Laureys a Castro, painted 1672 National Maritime Museum, London

In late 32 BC, the Senate revoked Antony's upcoming consulship and declared war on Cleopatra. (Note: As historians Duane W. Roller, Adrian Goldsworthy, Patricia Southern, and Prudence Jones point out, war was declared specifically against Cleopatra and her Ptolemaic Kingdom, not against fellow citizen Mark Antony, which was easier to sell to the Roman people who were wary of further civil wars among Romans, but who could stomach a war against a foreign queen who posed a legitimate threat. Additionally, Roller highlights how the legal grounds for the war were based on the fact that Cleopatra was illicitly arming and supplying troops to a private Roman citizen, Antony, whose triumviral authority had by now technically expired.) Octavian used emergency powers to have men of military age throughout the Republic swear an oath of loyalty to him. In early 31 BC, as Antony and Cleopatra moved to Greece, Octavian's forces under Agrippa transited the Adriatic Sea and severed their supply routes in the Ionian Sea. Octavian, landing in Epirus, proceeded to march south. Antony's men then started to desert as Octavian prepared for battle.

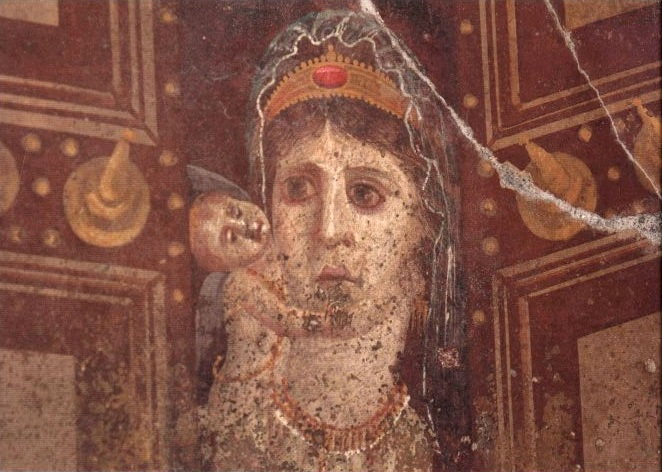
This mid-1st-century BC Roman wall painting in the House of Marcus Fabius Rufus, Pompeii, is most likely a depiction of Cleopatra VII of Ptolemaic Egypt as Venus Genetrix, with her son Caesarion as Cupid, similar in appearance to the now-lost statue of Cleopatra erected by Julius Caesar in the Temple of Venus Genetrix (within the Forum of Caesar). Its owner walled off the room with this painting, most likely in immediate reaction to the execution of Caesarion on orders of Augustus in 30 BC, when artistic depictions of Caesarion would have been considered a sensitive issue for the ruling regime.

Antony's fleet sailed through the bay of Actium along the Ambracian Gulf of western Greece to break the blockade. There, they fought the Battle of Actium on 2 September 31 BC. Cleopatra and her naval forces withdrew early in the battle and Antony later joined them; Cleopatra's fleet rescued Antony's remaining forces in a final effort. Antony's nearby forces on land surrendered to Octavian after attempting a retreat through Macedonia. (Note: After Actium, Octavian returned to Italy to settle affairs there with the legions that were formerly under Mark Antony, to pacify them with money or lands. Only a month after landing at Brundisium, Octavian set out again for the east, traveling first to Greece, then to Syria, and from there marched his forces into Ptolemaic Egypt.) Various client kings now defected to Octavian. (Note: Herod the Great of Judea met Octavian at Rhodes. Herod would help supply Octavian's forces at Ptolemais in Phoenicia during their march to Egypt.) Octavian would later establish a new city—Nicopolis ('victory city')—near the site of the battle at Actium.

After Octavian defeated Antony at Alexandria on 1 August 30 BC, Antony died by suicide. After meeting with Octavian and refusing to be paraded in a Roman triumph, Cleopatra took her own life with poison. Aware of the dangers presented by another potential heir to Julius Caesar, Octavian had Cleopatra's son Caesarion executed. He also killed Antony's son Marcus Antonius Antyllus, but spared their other children and pardoned many of his opponents. Octavian had previously shown little mercy to surrendered enemies, but ensured that Cleopatra was buried with Antony in their tomb. After the wedding of Cleopatra's daughter Cleopatra Selene II and Juba II of Numidia in 25 BC, he appointed them as co-rulers of Mauretania.

== Sole ruler of Rome ==
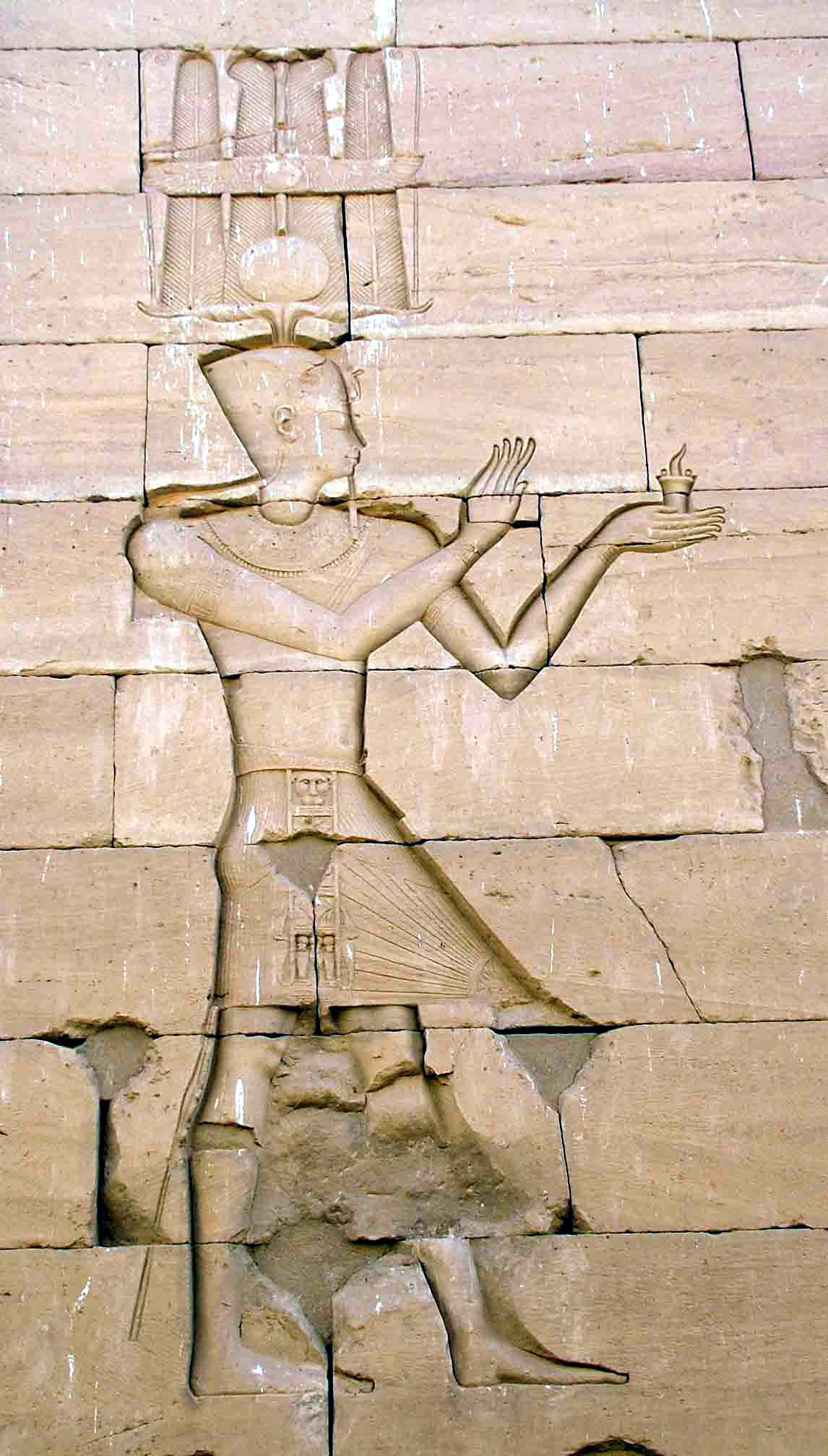
Augustus as Roman pharaoh in an Egyptian-style stone carving at the Temple of Kalabsha in Nubia; Augustus was commonly depicted in Egyptian art performing sacrifices to Egyptian deities.

=== Control of Egypt ===
The conquest of Egypt greatly relieved Octavian's wartime debts. He controlled Roman Egypt directly, forbade senators to travel there, and appointed equestrian governor Cornelius Gallus to supervise its administration and lucrative taxation. While in Alexandria in 30 BC, Octavian visited the tomb of Alexander the Great, whom he idolized in his own portraits. Octavian's conquest of Egypt ended the Hellenistic period; it also cemented the cultural formation of a Greek East and Latin West in the Mediterranean and a cosmopolitan universal monarchy centered on Rome.

Octavian became the first Roman pharaoh of Egypt, but did not partake in Egyptian coronation rites or worship of the Apis bull, and never visited Egypt again after 30 BC. Before returning to Rome, Octavian wintered in 30 BC on the Greek island of Samos. In August the following year, he celebrated three triumphs in Rome for his victories in Illyria, Greece, and Egypt. Together with his friend and general Agrippa, he was elected as consul for 28 BC, and granted the powers of a censor so as to conduct the census.

=== Principate ===
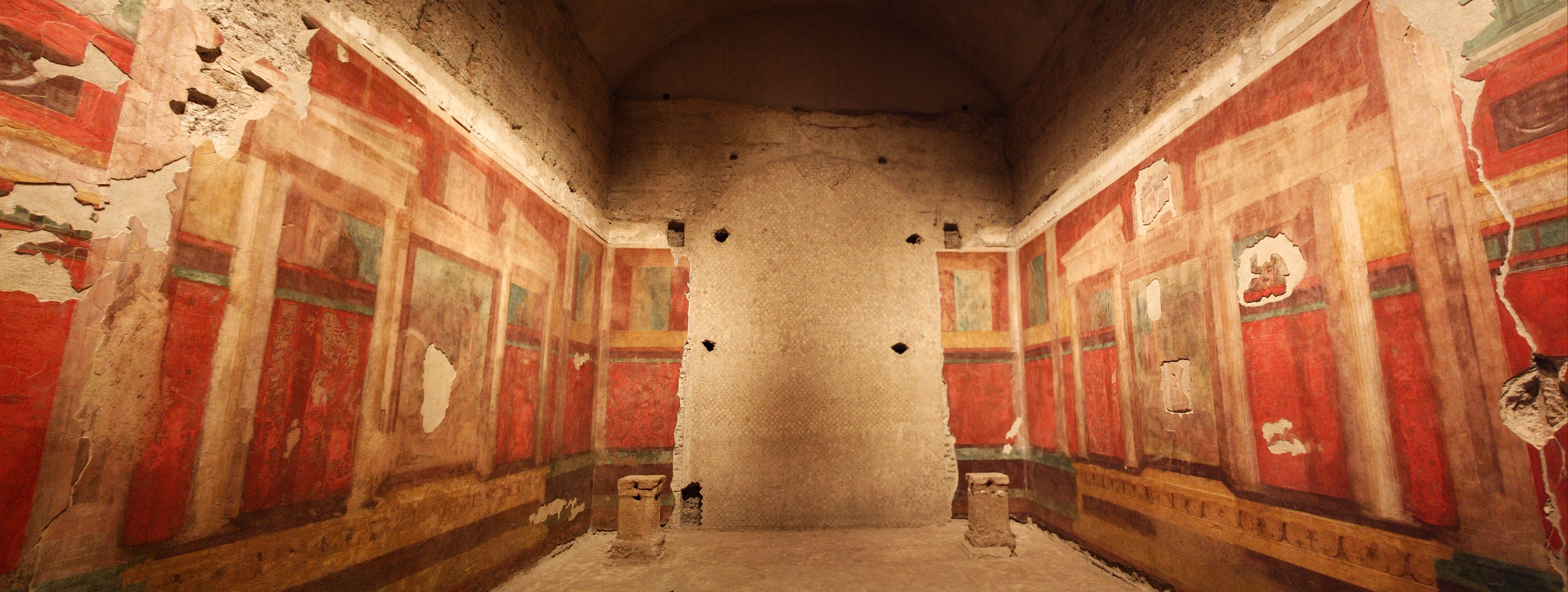
Fresco paintings inside the House of Augustus, his alleged but not verified residence on the Palatine Hill during his reign as emperor

After defeating Antony and Cleopatra, Octavian sought to rule the Republic as a principate, with himself as princeps ('leading citizen' or 'first citizen'), (Note: Alternatively, Werner Eck and Sarolta Takács describe princeps as "first or chief man in the state".) and he gradually courted the Senate and people of Rome while purporting not to aspire to dictatorship or monarchy. Years of civil war had left Rome in a state of near lawlessness, but republican tradition opposed autocracy. At the same time, Octavian could not give up his authority without risking war. The Senate and people desired stability, traditional legality, civility, and free elections—which would be conducted in name at least under Octavian, soon to be princeps Augustus. (Note: Adrian Goldsworthy highlights this with the example of the Senate under consul Octavian decreeing that the doors to the Temple of Janus should be shut on 11 January 29 BC, a ritual that declared Rome was no longer at war, despite ongoing campaigns in Gaul and Hispania.) Octavian established this regime through trial by error, experimentation, popular support for legally sanctioned moves, and term limits for offices, perhaps cautious to avoid the same fate as his adoptive father Julius Caesar. (Note: Historian Adrian Goldsworthy stresses that Augustus did not have a carefully planned design in fashioning this principate regime, which was far from inevitable, and relied much on chance, experimentation, improvisation, and trial-by-error. In his "Caesar Augustus: A Call to Order" historian T. P. Wiseman argues that, given the overwhelmingly positive reception of Augustus in contemporary Roman sources, Augustus should not be viewed as an unlawful usurper masking his monarchical intentions or autocratic wishes. Patricia Southern surmises that Octavian needed to at least keep up the appearance of being bound by term limits for the consulship and other offices: "Octavian probably remembered very starkly that Caesar did not survive for more than a few weeks after accepting the appointment as dictator perpetuo".)

=== First settlement ===
==== Control of provinces ====
On 13 January 27 BC, Octavian publicly returned power to the Senate and relinquished his provinces and armies. However, soldiers remained loyal to him and many clients and adherents depended on his wealth and patronage. (Note: Historians Werner Eck and Sarolta Takács state the following about patronage and other matters: "The sum of his power derived first of all from various powers of office delegated to him by the Senate and people, secondly from his immense private fortune, and thirdly from numerous patron-client relationships he established with individuals and groups throughout the Empire. All of them taken together formed the basis of his auctoritas, which he himself emphasized as the foundation of his political actions.") Other senators refrained from spending to build and maintain roads in Italy in 20 BC, but Octavian undertook this responsibility and the Roman currency issued in 16 BC publicized his involvement.

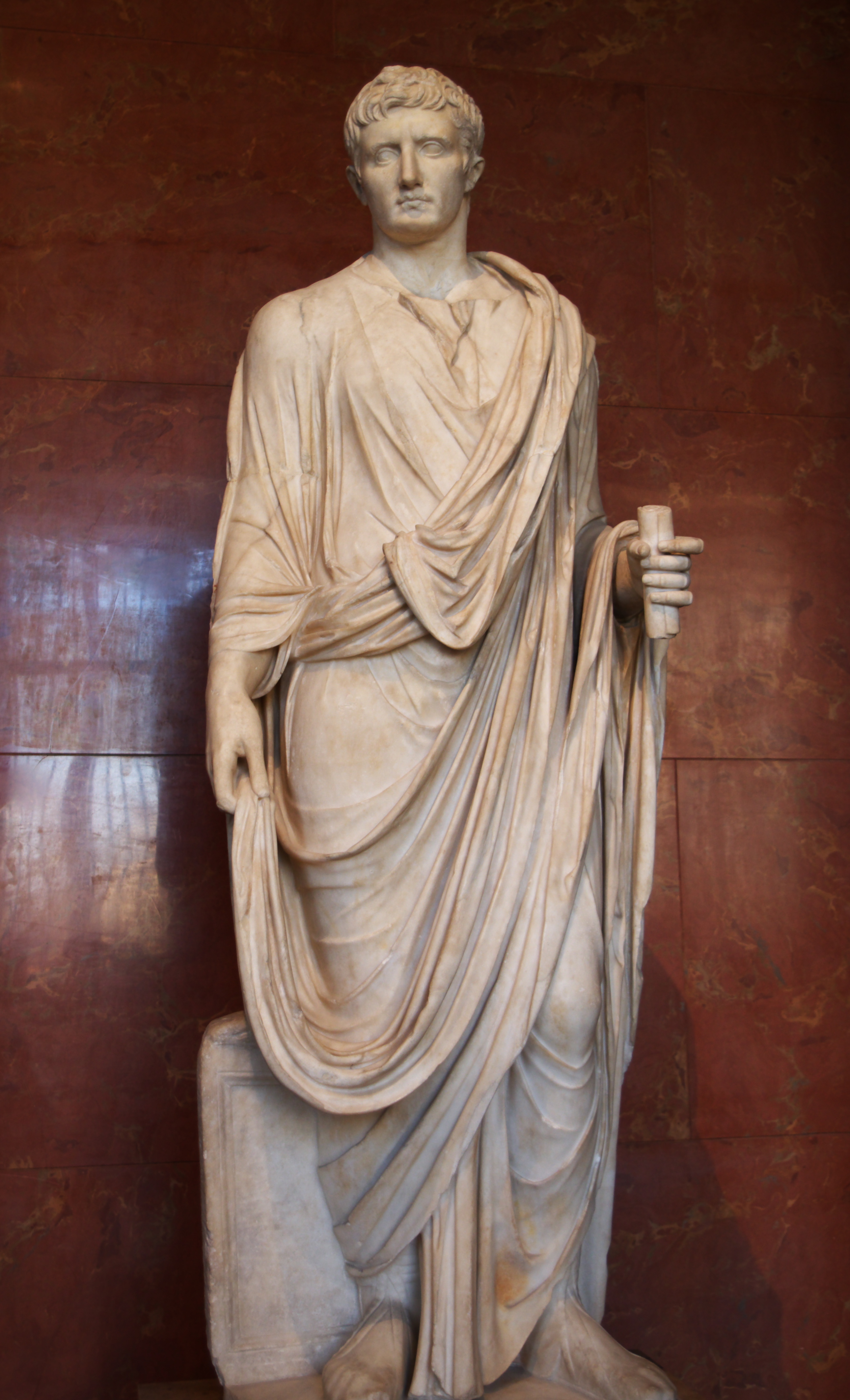
Octavian as a magistrate. The statue's marble head was made c. 30–20 BC, the body sculpted in the 2nd century AD (Louvre, Paris)

Under the first settlement, the Senate proposed that Octavian retake control of the provinces, continuing the appearance of a functioning constitution. Feigning reluctance, on 16 January 27 BC he accepted a ten-year responsibility of overseeing chaotic provinces constituting much of the Roman world, including Hispania, Gaul, Syria, Cilicia, Cyprus, and Egypt. Command of these provinces gave him control over the majority of Rome's legions. Octavian–Augustus's power ultimately rested in his control over Rome's military.

However, Octavian–Augustus did not have a monopoly on political and martial power. The Senate still controlled the grain-producing North Africa as well as the militarily strategic Illyria and Macedonia. However, the Senate controlled only five or six legions under three proconsuls, while Augustus controlled twenty legions, and their control of these regions did not rival his authority. Augustus used republican precedents of divided control between senators and proconsuls to amass power.

While Augustus acted as consul in Rome, he dispatched senators to the provinces under his command as his representatives to manage provincial affairs. The Senate chose governors to oversee the remaining provinces. Augustus issued instructions and edicts to both his own legates and proconsuls governing senatorial provinces. Augustus's control of entire provinces followed Republican-era precedents for the limited objective of securing peace and creating stability, with Pompey having been given a similar level of command across the Roman world. (Note: Pompey was given term limits for extraordinary proconsular authority that included legates who answered to him, not the Senate, during his campaign against Mediterranean pirates in 67 BC and the subsequent Third Mithridatic War against Mithridates VI of Pontus. These temporary powers included control over military operations across all Mediterranean shorelines extending 50 miles inland, and possibly greater authority than Roman provincial governors in these areas.)

==== Title of Augustus ====
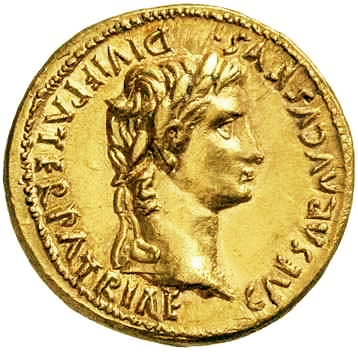
Aureus coin of Augustus minted c. AD 13, marked: Caesar Augustus Divi F Pater Patriae

On 16 January 27 BC (Note: Fasti Praenestini;Feriale Cumanum. Ovid's Fasti gives 13 January, the same date in which the Senate powers were "restored". The 3rd-century De die Natali gives 17 January, a mistake.) the Senate gave Octavian the title augustus ('revered'). (Note: Munatius Plancus was responsible for the building of the Temple of Saturn in Rome and led the peace negotiations with the Parthians in 20 BC. He also recommended the title augustus to Octavian in 27 BC; it was he who introduced the motion in the Senate to so entitle Octavian and may have done so at Octavian's request. Augustus, from the Latin augere 'to increase', can be translated as "illustrious one", "sublime", or "revered". The equivalent title in Ancient Greek is sebastos (Σεβαστός), the "revered". Adrian Goldsworthy explains further: "Augustus carried heavy religious overtones of the very Roman tradition of... augury. Ennius, Rome's earliest and most revered poet, spoke of the City being founded with 'august augury' in a passage as familiar to Romans as the most famous Shakespearean quotes are to us today".) This title, one of religious rather than political authority, indicated that Octavian approached divinity. Future Roman emperors inherited the honorific augustus, and it became their main title. Another titular option, that of Romulus, after the legendary founder of Rome, was associated too strongly with monarchy, an association Octavian sought to avoid. The Senate also confirmed his position as princeps senatus ('leader of the Senate'). Augustus styled himself Imperator Caesar divi filius ('Commander Caesar son of the deified one'), (Note: Adrian Goldsworthy includes the title 'Augustus' in the emperor's full name, rendering it as Imperator Caesar Augustus divi filius.) emphasizing his link to deified Julius Caesar. The use of imperator signified a permanent link to the Roman tradition of victory. (Note: He was first proclaimed imperator on 16 April 43 BC, after the Battle of Forum Gallorum.) Augustus transformed Caesar, a cognomen for one branch of the Julian family, into a new imperial family line that began with him.

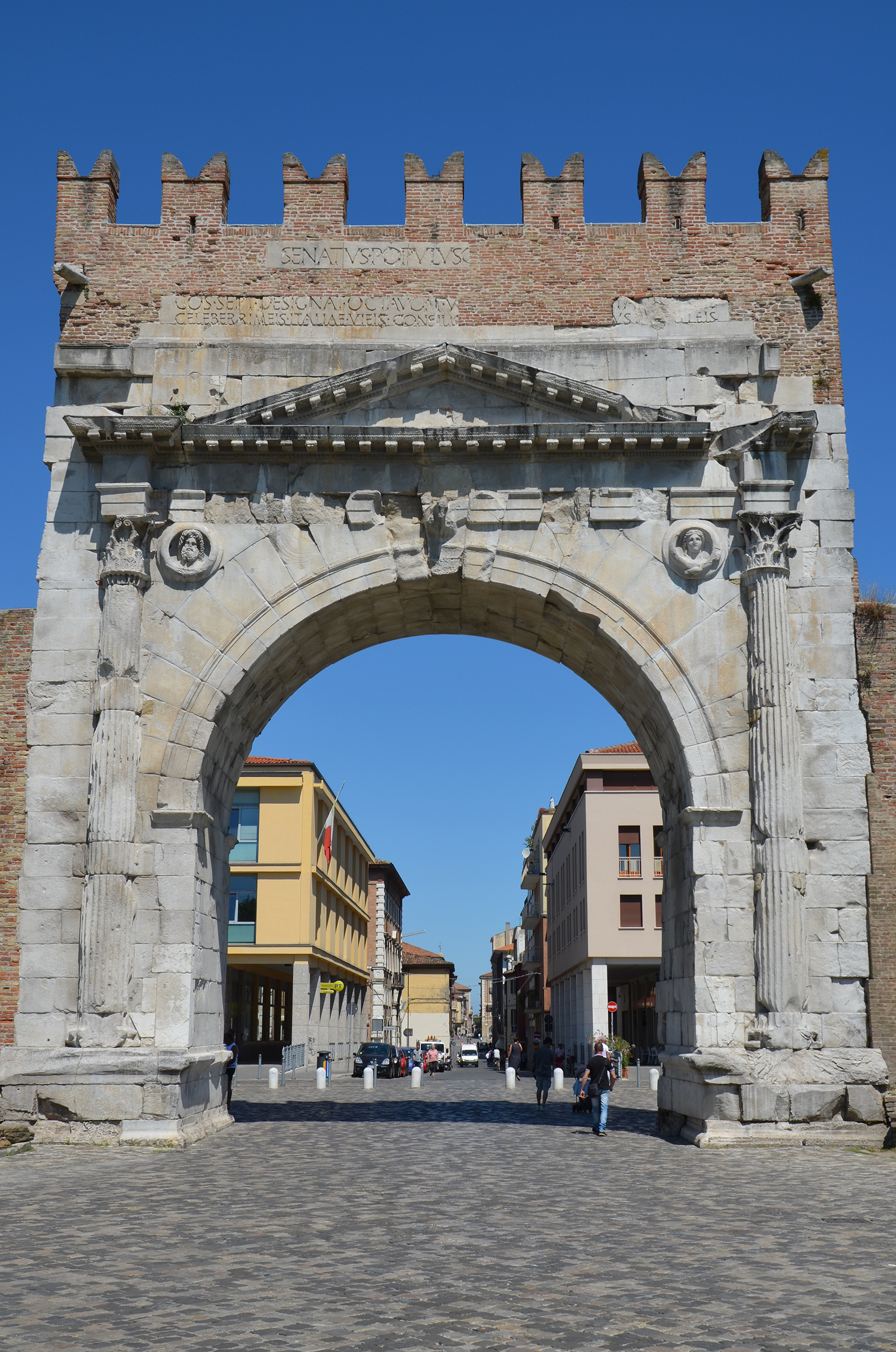
The Arch of Augustus in Rimini (Ariminum), dedicated to Augustus by the Senate in 27 BC, is one of the oldest preserved triumphal arches in Italy.

The Senate allowed Augustus to hang the corona civica ('civic crown') above his door and to have laurels drape his doorposts. He renounced flaunting insignia of power such as holding a scepter, wearing a diadem, or wearing the golden crown and purple toga of Julius Caesar. However, the Senate awarded him a golden shield displayed in the Curia with the inscription virtus, pietas, clementia, iustitia ('valor, piety, clemency, and justice'). By the summer of 27 BC he left Rome and traveled to Gaul. From 26 to 24 BC he governed the Empire from Tarraco in Roman Spain, overseeing military campaigns in the Iberian peninsula until his return to Rome.

=== Second settlement ===
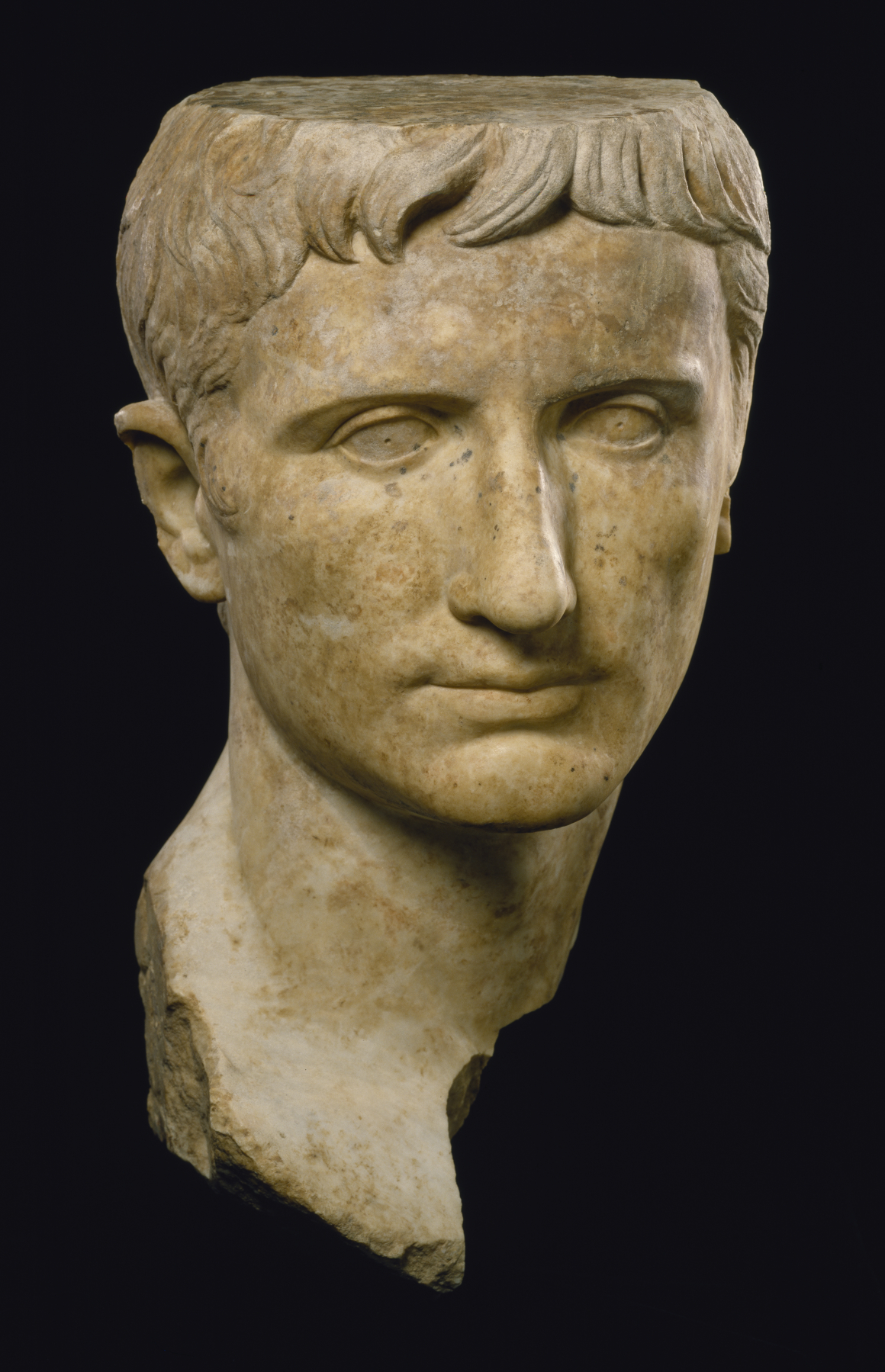
Portraits of Augustus show the emperor with idealized features.

By 23 BC, the first settlement's monarchical implications were apparent. Augustus's continuous consulships highlighted his political control and halved opportunities for others to achieve the prestigious office. His desire for his nephew Marcus Claudius Marcellus to succeed him in the principate also caused problems. To signal reconciliation with pro-republican aristocrats, Augustus appointed the noted republican Calpurnius Piso as co-consul in 23 BC, after his choice Aulus Terentius Varro Murena died unexpectedly.

==== Resignation from the consulship ====
In late spring Augustus was severely ill, apparently with liver disease. Expecting his death, he made arrangements ensuring the principate would continue while seeking to assure senators of his republicanism. He prepared to give his signet ring to his friend and general Agrippa, but handed his co-consul Piso all of his official documents, an account of public finances, and authority over provincial troops. Augustus left his nephew Marcellus nothing, surprising many who expected him to name an heir to his position as an unofficial emperor.

Augustus left his designated heirs only private property; an obvious system of imperial succession would have provoked resistance from republican-minded Romans. Augustus apparently thought the 19-year-old Marcellus unprepared to inherit his political pre-eminence, but his actions indicated his confidence in Agrippa as a potential successor. Marcellus died later that year.

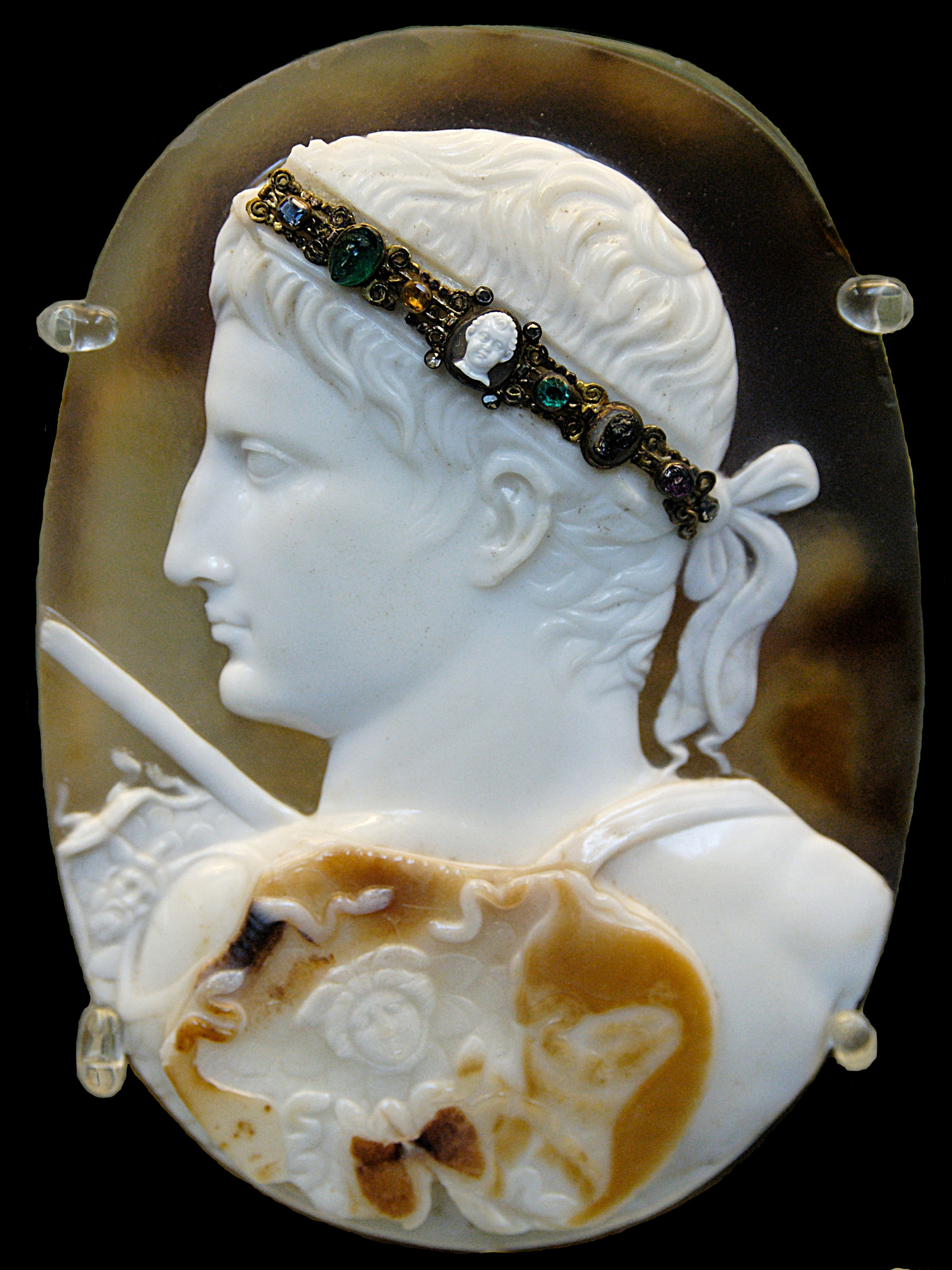
The Blacas Cameo showing Augustus wearing a gorgoneion on a three layered sardonyx cameo, and wearing a diadem that was added during the Middle Ages, and original artwork dated to AD 20–50

Augustus recovered, treated by his personal physician Antonius Musa, (Note: Antonius Musa most likely hailed from the Hellenized areas of the eastern half of the Roman Empire. After his recovery, Augustus lavished Musa with gifts and the Senate gave him additional money with the right to wear a golden ring. In honor of his medical treatment of Augustus, he was also granted exemption from taxation and a statue of him was erected next to that of Asclepius, the god of healing.) and he resigned the consulship on 1 July 23 BC. He would serve as consul only twice more, in 5 and 2 BC, both times to introduce his grandsons into public life. Resigning the consulship allowed Augustus to exercise wider patronage among senators while giving others a better chance to become consul. However, Augustus desired to retain his consular imperium throughout the empire, leading him to negotiate the second settlement with the Senate.

==== Marcus Primus affair ====
Augustus's resignation as consul limited his political authority, although he still controlled some provinces as a proconsul. When he annually held the office of consul, he had the power to intervene with the affairs of the other provincial proconsuls appointed by the Senate throughout the empire, when he deemed necessary. The subsequent development of the "Marcus Primus affair" indicated the need for the second settlement. In late 24 or early 23 BC, charges were brought against Marcus Primus, former proconsular governor of Macedonia, for waging a war without the Senate's approval on the Odrysian kingdom of Thrace, whose king was a Roman ally. Lucius Licinius Varro Murena defended Primus, arguing that Augustus had ordered Primus to attack the client state. Primus later testified that Marcellus gave the orders before dying, suggesting that Augustus intended to have him take his place as princeps and establish a monarchy over Rome. Such orders would have violated the Senate's prerogatives under the settlement of 27 BC, since Macedonia was a senatorial province, not an imperial one.

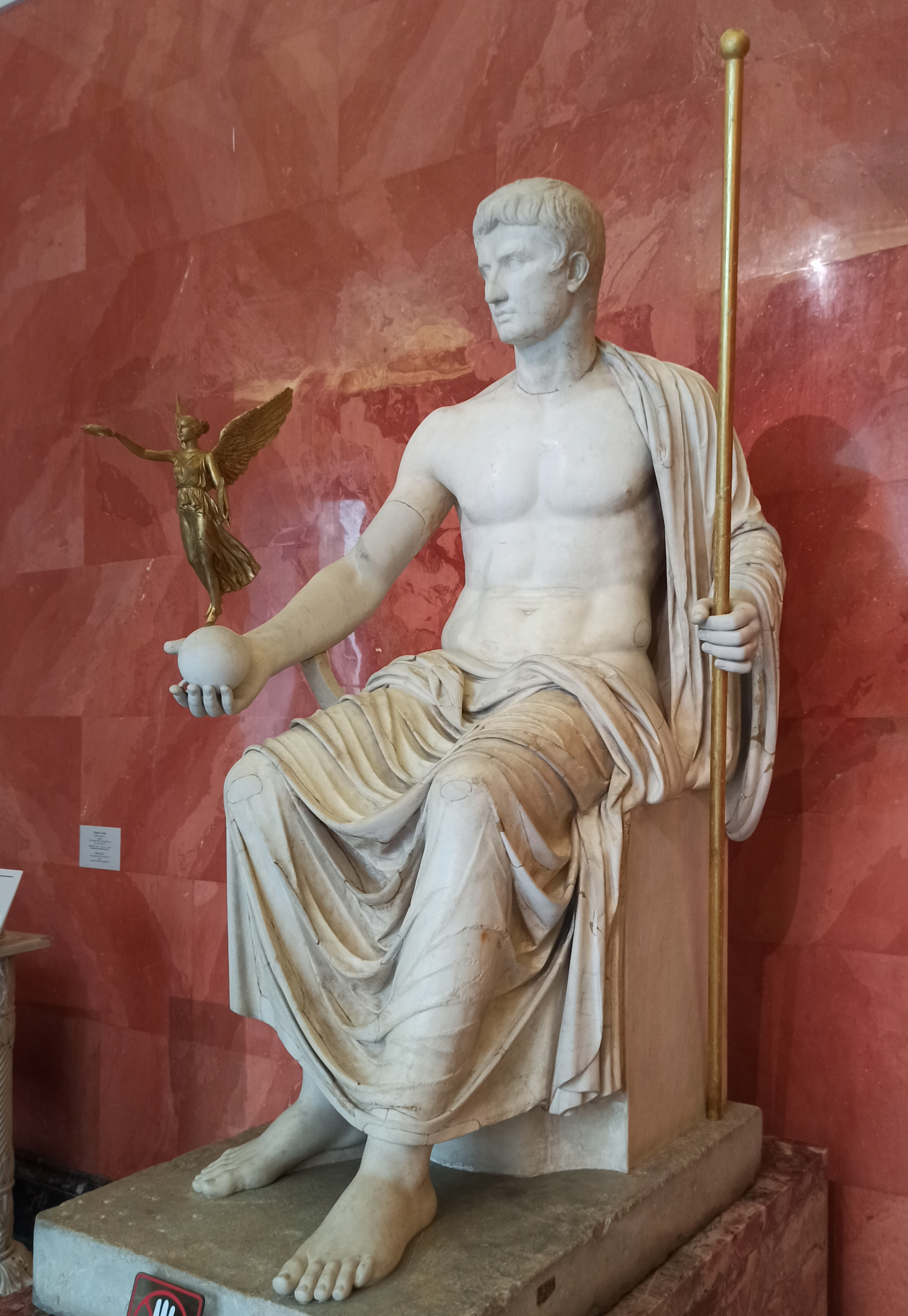
Augustus as Jupiter, holding a scepter and orb (first half of the 1st century AD), Hermitage Museum

The situation was so serious that Augustus appeared at the trial even though he had not been called as a witness. Under oath, he declared that he gave no such order. Murena disbelieved Augustus's testimony and resented his attempt to subvert the trial by using his auctoritas. He demanded to know why Augustus appeared at the trial; Augustus replied that he came in the public interest. The jurors convicted Primus, though some voted to acquit, suggesting that some disbelieved Augustus's claims.

==== Greater proconsular authority ====
The Senate negotiated the second settlement with Augustus to formalize his legal authority over senatorial provinces, granting him general imperium proconsulare ('proconsular power') throughout the empire. They also augmented Augustus's proconsular imperium into imperium proconsulare maius ('greater proconsular power') applicable across the empire, giving Augustus constitutional power superior to all other proconsuls. Augustus stayed in Rome during the renewal process and obtained veterans' support for the renewal of his proconsular imperium maius in 13 BC through lavish donations.

=== Additional powers ===
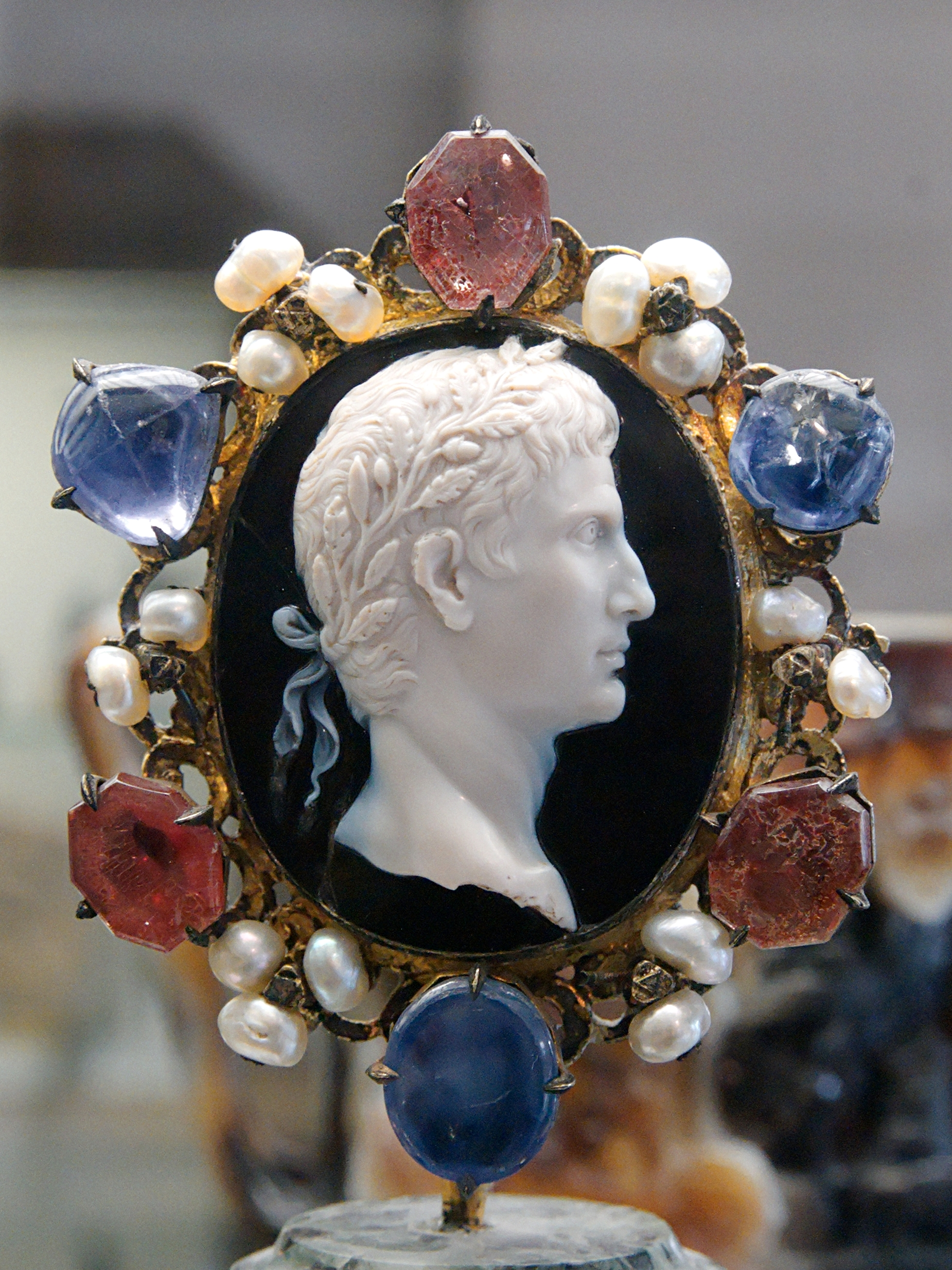
Portrait of Augustus. Sardonyx cameo; gilt silver mount with pearls, sapphires and red glass beads, 16th/17th centuries.

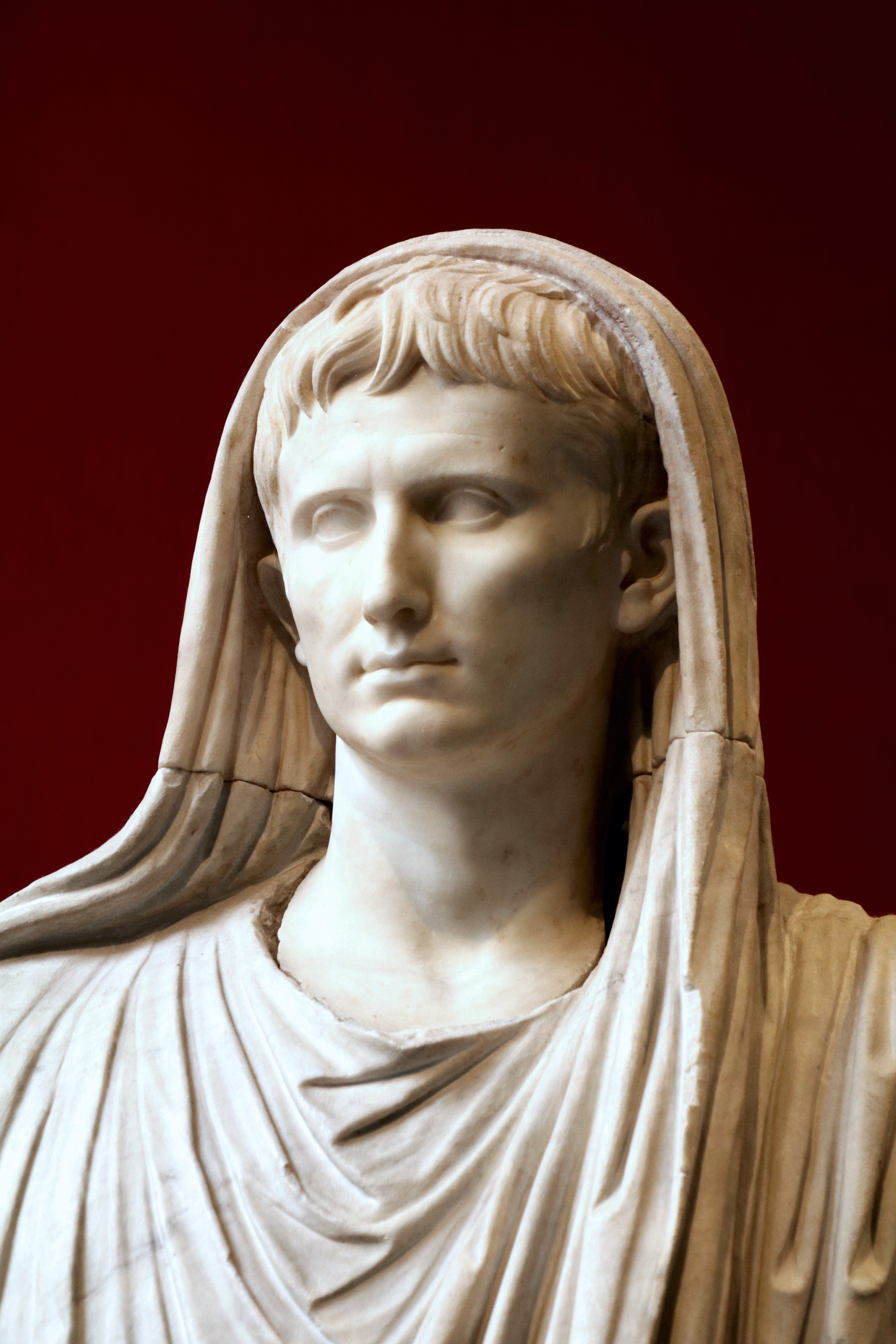
The head of the Via Labicana Augustus statue depicting the emperor as pontifex maximus, Roman artwork of the late Augustan period, last decade of the 1st century BC

==== Powers of the tribune ====
The second settlement also gave Augustus the power of a tribune (tribunicia potestas) for life, though not the official title of tribune. He had already received tribunicia sacrosanctitas, the immunity given to a tribune of the plebs, and now assumed the full powers of the magistracy, renewed annually, in perpetuity. Legally, it was closed to patricians, a status that Augustus had acquired when adopted by Julius Caesar. This power allowed him to convene the Senate and people at will, lay business before them, veto their decisions, preside over elections, and speak first at any meeting. Augustus's amassing of tribunal powers caused the office of tribunus plebis to lose prestige, so he revived its importance by requiring any plebeian desiring the praetorship to hold it.

==== Powers of the censor ====
Augustus's tribunician authority also included powers usually reserved for the Roman censor, such as supervising public morals, reviewing laws in the public interest, holding censuses, and determining Senate membership. No precedent existed in Rome for combining the powers of the tribune and the censor, and Augustus was never elected censor. Julius Caesar had received similar powers, wherein he was charged with supervising the morals of the state. However, this position did not extend to the censor's ability to hold a census and determine the Senate's roster. Appealing to patriotic sentiments, Augustus is alleged to have used censorial powers to ban all attire except the classic toga for those entering the Forum. However, the powers of the censorship may have only been temporary or even refused by Augustus.

==== Imperium over the city of Rome ====
The Senate also granted Augustus sole imperium within the city of Rome. Traditionally, proconsuls lost their imperium when they crossed into Rome through the pomerium—its sacred boundary. In these situations, consular authority outweighed Augustus's tribuncian authority. Others would usually obey his wishes, but occasional conflict was possible. In either 23 or 19 BC, (Note: Cotton & Yakobson (2002, pp. 199–200) discusses the possibility of this happening with the "second settlement" of 23 BC, when Augustus already had control over the praetorian cohorts, and certainly with the grant of imperium proconsulare maius in 19 BC that gave Augustus authority over Italy and Rome, not just the Roman provinces) the Senate voted that Augustus's imperium proconsulare maius ('superior proconsular power') should not lapse when he was inside the city walls. Augustus now took from urban praetors and consuls control over the city's armed forces.

==== The Roman triumph ====
After 19 BC, Augustus received credit for every Roman military victory, because most legions served in imperial provinces overseen by the legati, his provincial deputies. If a battle was fought in a senatorial province, Augustus's proconsular imperium maius allowed him to take command and credit for any major victory. With few exceptions only Augustus could receive a triumph, a tradition that allegedly began with Romulus, the legendary first king of Rome. Cornelius Balbus was the last person outside Augustus's family to receive a triumph, celebrating his victory against the Garamantes in Roman Libya in 19 BC. (Note: Licinius Crassus (grandson of the triumvir) was awarded a triumph for his victories in Thrace against the Germanic Bastarnae in 29–27 BC, but was denied other traditional honors. Marcus Vipsanius Agrippa was awarded a triumph for victories in Spain in 19 BC but he refused to celebrate it. Agrippa had also refused to celebrate a triumph during his consulship of 37 BC during the triumvirate, after he returned from Gaul in 38 BC. Ancient historians claim that this was a move to avoid highlighting recent failures by Octavian. Patricia Southern states that it is equally likely that "the refusal was part of Octavian's wish to limit the numbers of men who were permitted to hold a triumph to immediate family members. Generals parading to the Capitol in their triumphant garb might just start to develop ideas above their station".) Tiberius, Augustus's eldest stepson, received triumphs in 7 BC and AD 12, respectively for victories in Germania and Illyria (Pannonia). For the latter campaign, his nephew Germanicus instead received the ornamenta triumphalia ('triumphal honors'), a praetorship, and the ability to stand for the consulship despite his young age.

==== Diplomacy ====
Augustus received emissaries from as far east as India, and his court included political exiles from as far north as the British Isles with the chieftains Dubnovellaunus and Tincomarus. (Note: The Roman historian Florus claimed that the silk-producing Seres, possibly the Han Chinese, visited the court of Augustus alongside emissaries from India. However, Augustus does not mention the Seres in his Res Gestae. The ancient Chinese historians do not mention any official attempts by the Han dynasty to establish contacts with Rome (referred to as Da Qin) before AD 97 when the military commander Ban Chao sent his ambassador Gan Ying on a diplomatic mission to Rome, though he never reached further than the Persian Gulf under Parthian control.) Foreign embassies typically approached Augustus directly, though he sometimes deferred to the Senate. For instance, in 20 BC he referred Parthian ambassadors to the Senate, but the latter sent them back to Augustus so they could negotiate solely with him instead. Representatives from provinces and semi-autonomous municipalities also visited the emperor's court as his administration traveled across the Empire. In AD 8, the elderly Augustus delegated the management of foreign embassies to three ex-consuls, allowing them to make all decisions not requiring his or the Senate's oversight.

=== Conspiracy, titles, and the share of power ===
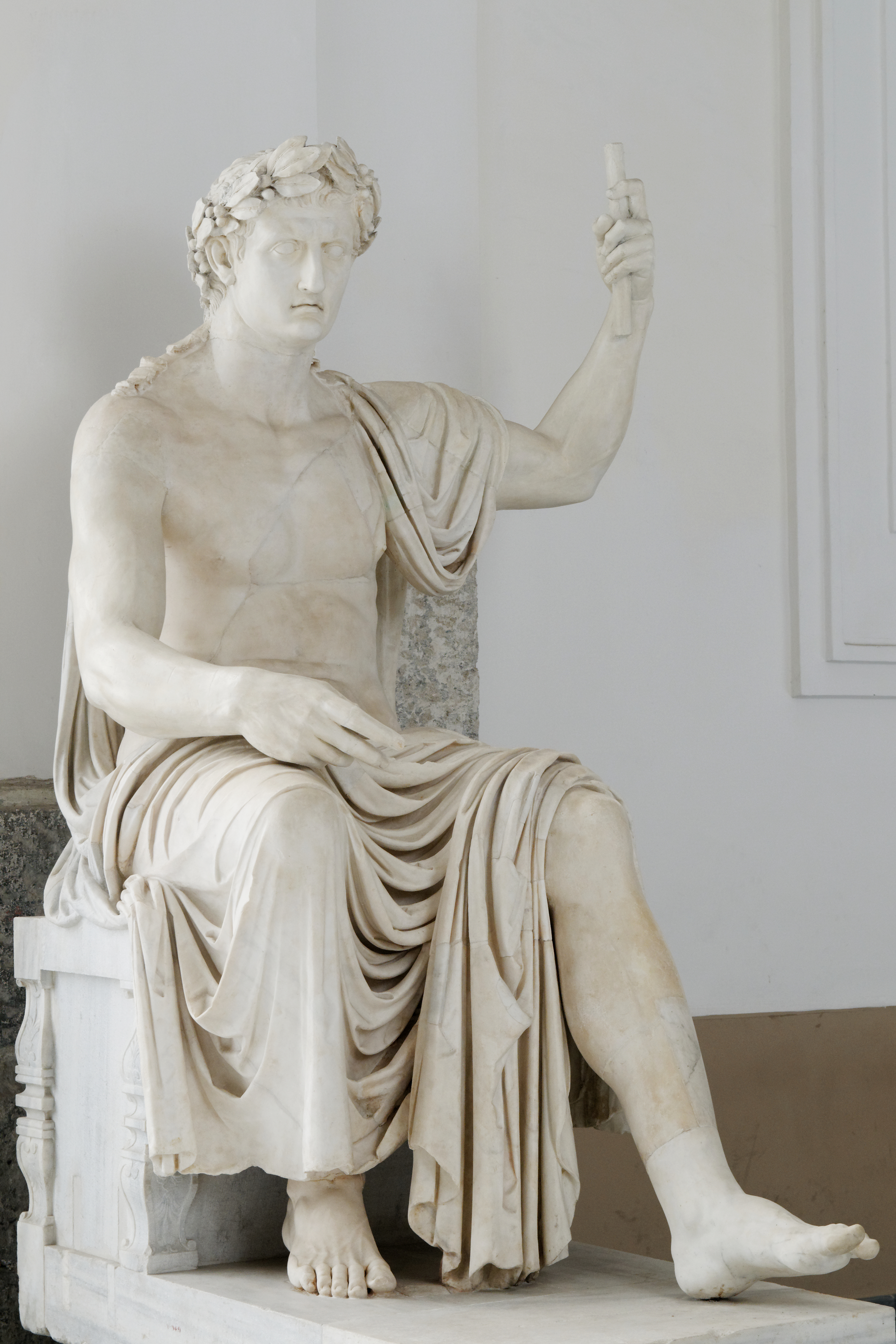
A colossal statue of Augustus from the Augusteum of Herculaneum, seated and wearing a laurel wreath

Augustus's plebeian supporters apparently misunderstood the political nuances of the second settlement; they occasionally formed violent mobs to demand his political involvement. When Augustus declined election as consul in 22 BC and traveled to Sicily, the Comitia centuriata nonetheless elected him co-consul for the following year. Rioting ensued in Rome when Marcus Lollius assumed office as the sole consul and supporters of the two remaining candidates clashed. Infuriated, Augustus summoned both candidates to Sicily and had one of them serve as Lollius's co-consul.

A food shortage in Rome during 22 BC sparked widespread panic, prompting calls for Augustus to take on dictatorial powers to personally oversee the crisis. After publicly refusing the request, Augustus accepted authority Rome's grain supply by using his existing proconsular imperium, quickly ending the crisis. Another food crisis in AD 8 prompted Augustus to establish a praefectus annonae, a permanent prefect who was in charge of procuring food supplies for Rome.

Concern over Augustus's expansive powers culminated in the apparent conspiracy of Fannius Caepio. Before 1 September 22 BC, a certain Castricius informed Augustus of a conspiracy led by Fannius Caepio. The conspirators, including Murena of the Marcus Primus affair, were tried in absentia with Augustus's stepson Tiberius as prosecutor; the jury convicted them, though the verdict was not unanimous. All the accused were executed for treason as soon as they were captured—without ever giving testimony in their defense. Augustus concealed these events to maintain the façade of republican government.

In 19 BC, the Senate granted Augustus additional imperium consulare maius proconsular powers, extending his authority across Italy. To appease the populace, Augustus was allowed to wear the consul's insignia in public and before the Senate, to sit in the symbolic chair between the two consuls, and to hold the magisterial fasces. On 6 March 12 BC, after Marcus Lepidus died, he became pontifex maximus, the high priest of the College of Pontiffs. (Note: The date is provided by inscribed calendars. Dio reports this under 13 BC, probably as the year in which Lepidus died.) On 5 February 2 BC, the Senate gave Augustus the title pater patriae ('father of the country'), which was then inscribed in various places in Rome such as the Senate chambers in the Forum Romanum.

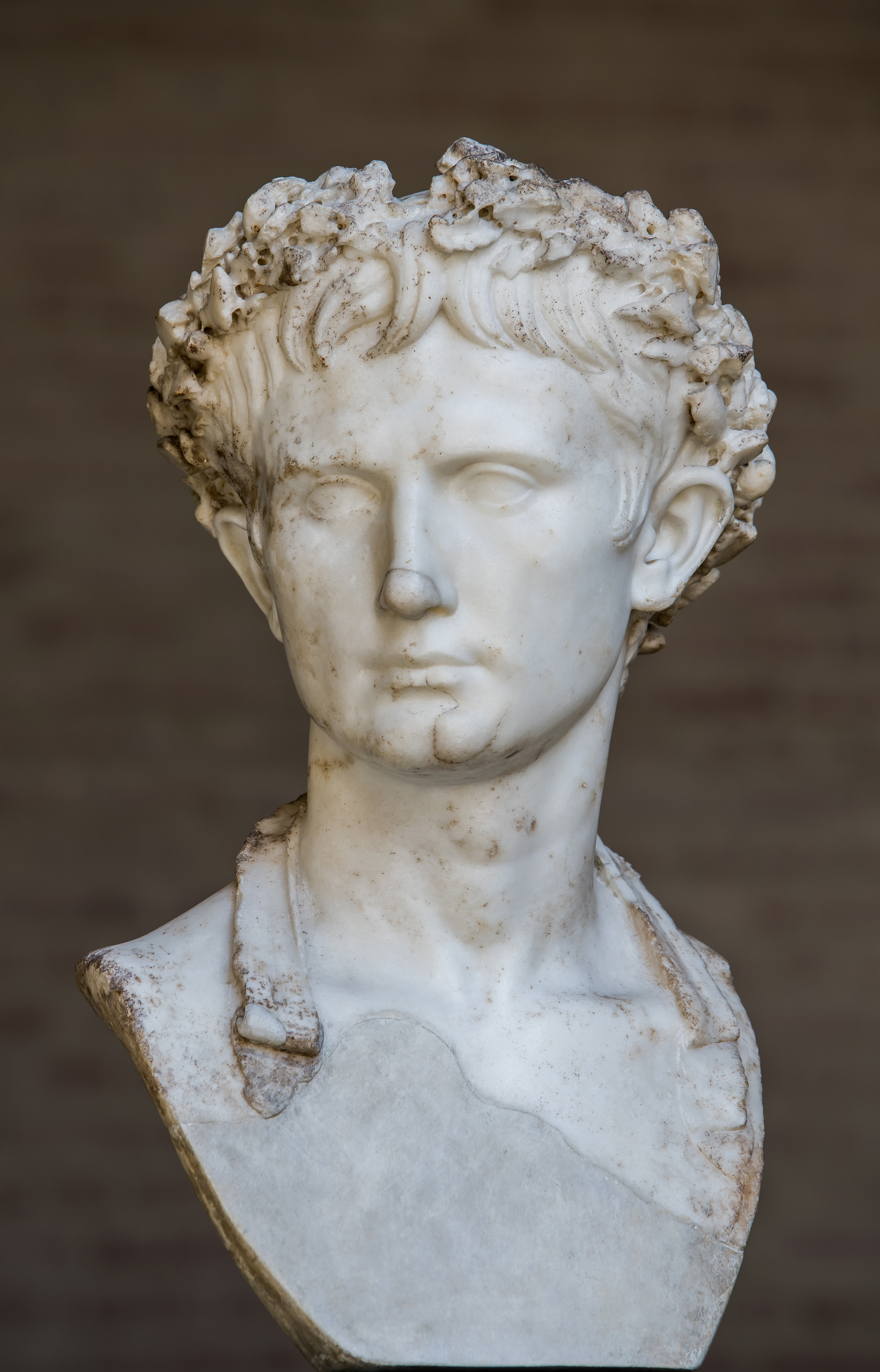
Bust of Augustus wearing the Civic Crown, at Glyptothek, Munich

Historian Ronald Syme wrote that Augustus's death could cause further civil war, given the public memory of recent wars and Caesar's assassination. Possibly during the 20s BC and certainly by 18 BC, the Senate granted Marcus Agrippa proconsular imperium for five years, similar to Augustus's power, to accomplish constitutional stability. The grant probably covered Augustus's imperial provinces if not authority over senatorial provinces. Like Augustus, Agrippa also received the powers of the tribunate.

=== War and expansion ===
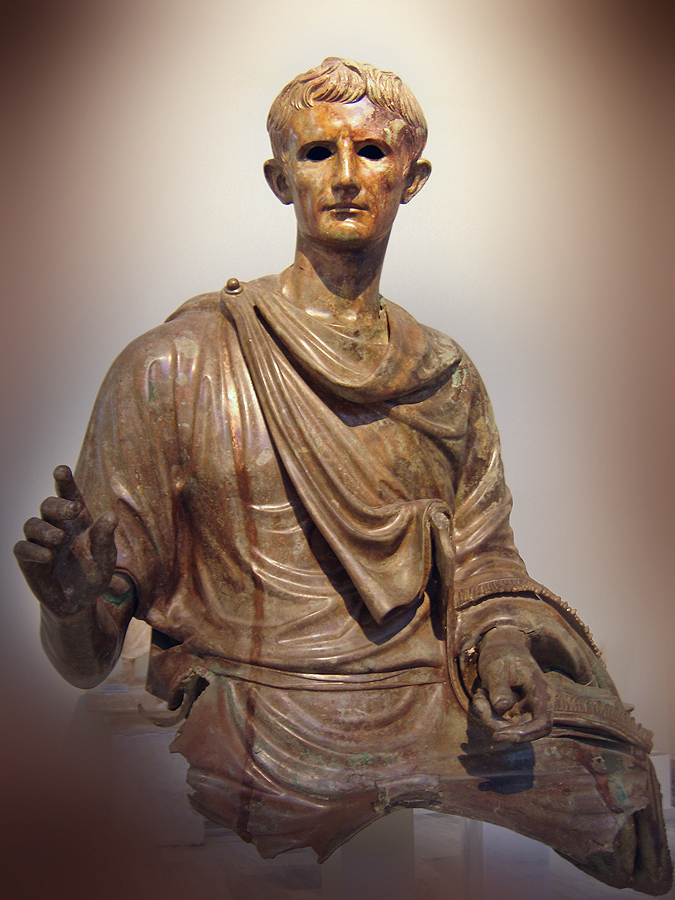
A fragment of an equestrian statue of Augustus, 1st century BC, National Archaeological Museum, Athens

By AD 13, Augustus's troops had proclaimed him imperator 21 times for military victories. The fourth chapter of his published account of achievements, the Res Gestae, details his military victories and honors. Augustus promoted the ideal of Roman superiority, which the poet Virgil attributed to a legendary ancestor of Augustus. All classes at Rome apparently sought expansionism, an ambition given divine sanction in Virgil's Aeneid, in which Jupiter promises Rome imperium sine fine ('sovereignty without end'). (Note: Patricia Southern writes that this concept of imperium sine fine ('sovereignty without end') only came into doubt after the disastrous loss at the Battle of Teutoburg Forest in AD 9 and the withdrawal from Germania beyond the Rhine River, whereas the Romans had previously established their control as far as the Elbe.)

By the end of Augustus's reign, his armies had conquered northern Hispania (modern Spain and Portugal) and the Alpine regions of Raetia and Noricum (modern Switzerland, Bavaria, Austria, Slovenia), Illyricum and Pannonia (modern Albania, Croatia, Hungary, Serbia, etc.), and had extended the borders of Africa Proconsularis to the east and south. Judea was added to the province of Syria when Augustus deposed the client king Herod Archelaus. After the Senate assigned him Syria in 27 BC, Augustus delegated it first to Agrippa's legates and later to equestrian prefects. In AD 6 Augustus also appointed an equestrian governor in Sardinia after pirate raids necessitated the presence of troops stationed there.

In 25 BC Rome peacefully annexed Galatia (part of modern Turkey) after the murder of its king, Amyntas, while in 19 BC Agrippa incorporated Asturias and Cantabria in modern-day Spain under the provinces of Hispania and Lusitania. This region was a major asset in funding Augustus's future military campaigns; it was rich in mineral deposits that could be fostered in Roman mining projects. Conquering the peoples of the Alps in 15 BC after the disastrous defeat of Lollius was another important victory for Rome, (Note: Patricia Southern writes that there was a follow-up campaign in the Alps by Tiberius as late as 6 BC.) since it provided a large territorial buffer between the Roman citizens of Italy and Rome's enemies in Germania to the north. Horace dedicated an ode to the victory, while the monumental Trophy of Augustus was built in La Turbie near Monaco to honor the occasion.

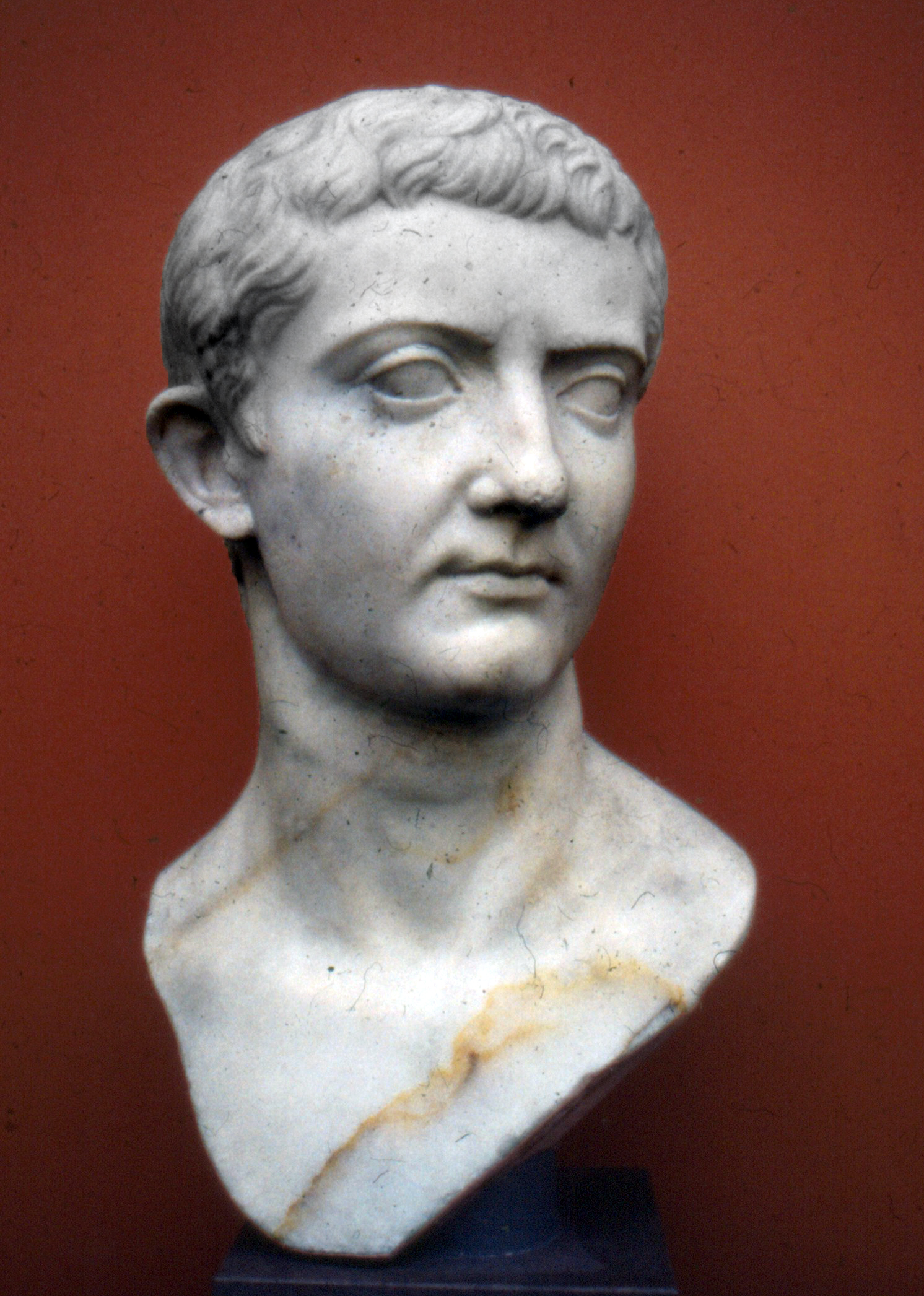
Bust of Tiberius, a successful military commander under Augustus who was designated as his heir and successor, Ny Carlsberg Glyptotek, Copenhagen

The capture of the Alps aided the next offensive in 12 BC, when Augustus's stepsons Tiberius and Drusus campaigned against the Pannonian tribes of Illyricum and against the Germanic tribes of the eastern Rhineland, respectively. Both campaigns were successful, but Drusus died shortly after his victory in 9 BC from an injury sustained by falling off his horse. Tiberius rushed from Italy to Germany to see his brother and escorted Drusus's body to Rome, where he and Augustus provided eulogies for Drusus. After Illyrian tribes revolted in Illyricum in AD 6, forces under the generals Tiberius and Germanicus quelled their rebellion in AD 9. This was the only major rebellion within Roman provincial territory since Augustus had become emperor, and by this point he had reduced the standing Roman army from roughly 500,000 soldiers during the civil wars down to 300,000 soldiers used primarily for foreign conquests.

To protect Rome's eastern territories from the Parthian Empire, Augustus relied on eastern client states to act as territorial buffers and sources of military support. Augustus stationed a Roman army in Syria, while Tiberius negotiated with the Parthians as Rome's diplomat to the East. Tiberius then restored Tigranes V to the Armenian throne in 20 BC, personally placing the crown on his head.

Augustus negotiated with Phraates IV of Parthia in 20 BC for the return of the battle standards lost by Crassus in the Battle of Carrhae, a symbolic victory that boosted Roman morale. Historians Werner Eck and Sarolta Takács claim that this was a great disappointment for Romans seeking military measures against Parthia. However, the return of the standards served as Augustan propaganda symbolizing Parthia's submission to Rome. The event was celebrated in art such as the breastplate design on the statue Augustus of Prima Porta and in monuments such as the Temple of Mars Ultor built to house the standards. After Phraates V of Parthia managed to cleave Armenia away from Roman control, Augustus dispatched his grandson Gaius Caesar with an army to Syria in 1 BC, mounting a diplomatic pressure campaign that in AD 2 convinced Phraates V to concede to Roman demands.

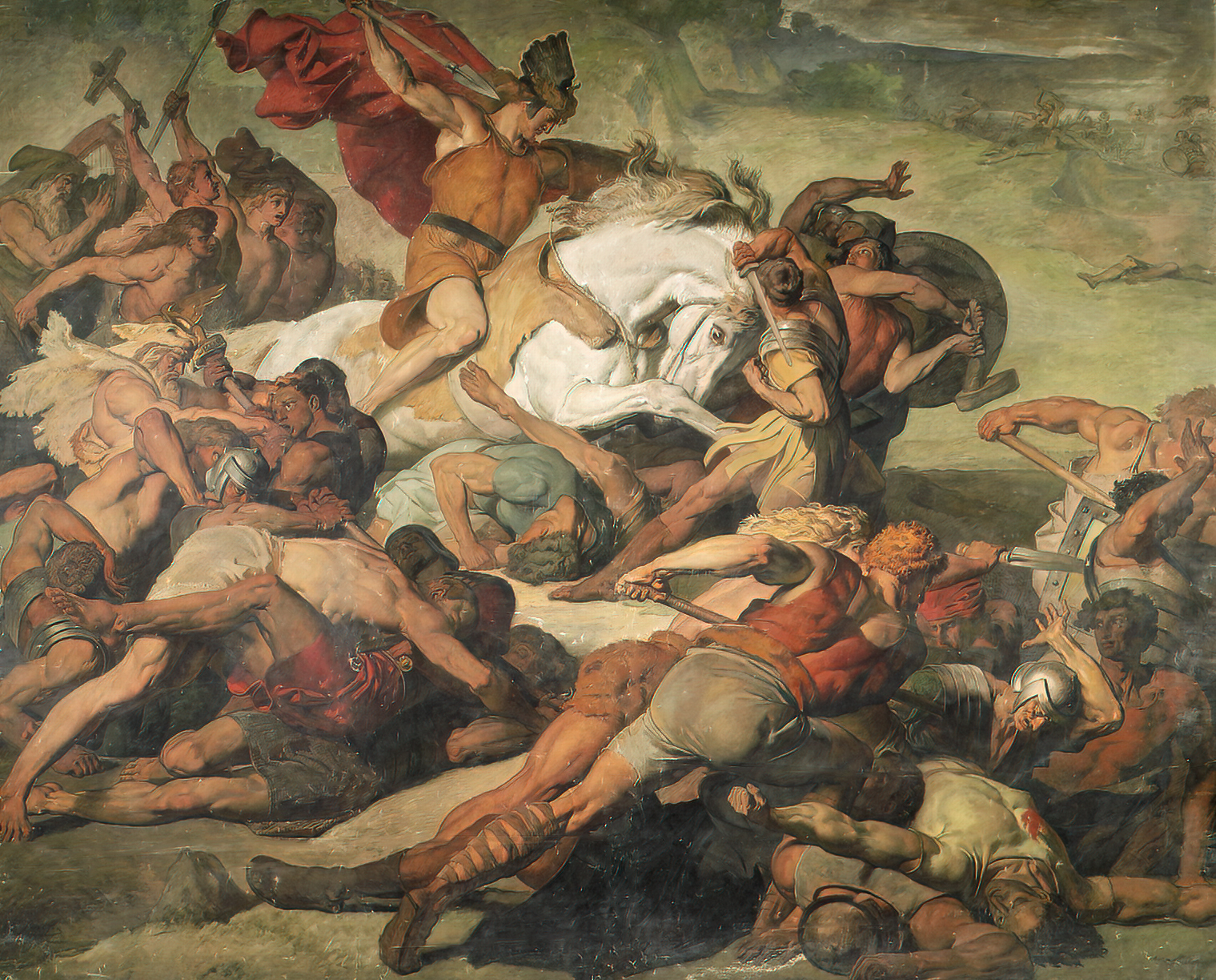
Der siegreich vordringende Hermann (The Victorious Advancing Hermann), depiction of the Battle of the Teutoburg Forest, by Peter Janssen, 1873

Parthia posed a threat to Rome in West Asia, but the more pressing concern was the battlefront along the Rhine and Danube rivers. During the triumvirate, Octavian's campaigns against the tribes in Dalmatia were the first step in expanding Roman dominions to the Danube. Rome's enemies in Germania almost constantly retook conquered territories. At the Battle of the Teutoburg Forest in AD 9, Arminius, the leader of the Cherusci, destroyed three entire legions led by Publius Quinctilius Varus. Augustus retaliated by dispatching Tiberius to the Rhineland to pacify it in AD 10 and AD 11, and these campaigns had some success. However, Augustus advised Tiberius against further conquests after the defeat at Teutoburg, and the Romans abandoned expansion into Germany beyond the Rhine. Although Augustus lamented the loss, his Res Gestae merely states that he pacified Germania up to the mouth of the Elbe. (Note: Historian Patricia Southern writes that "Tiberius retrieved the losses, remaining in Germany for another two years, in AD 10 watching in case the tribesmen penetrated to the Rhine and in AD 11 campaigning inside German territory — but not too far. Augustus wrote in the Res Gestae that he pacified Germany to the mouth of the Elbe, passing over in silence the losses of AD 9." Southern hints that "earlier versions of the Res Gestae, drafted before AD 9, would probably have stated 'I pacified Germany to the Elbe,' but after the disaster of Varus, the claims that German territory was overrun were reduced to the more modest 'to the mouth of the Elbe'. As for Augustus's territorial ambitions, Southern writes about his establishment of "an altar on the north bank" of the Elbe River in AD 1, and "perhaps at that date the concept of imperium sine fine was still valid, but whatever Augustus's initial intentions had been, dreams of conquest had faded. Augustus never recovered from the Varian disaster, and turned his back on expansion of the Empire. He was said to give vent to his feelings on occasion by shouting out loud, 'Quinctilius Varus, give me back my legions! and he certainly advised Tiberius not to attempt further conquests".) Under Augustus's successor Tiberius, Roman general Germanicus took advantage of a Cherusci civil war between Arminius and Segestes, defeating Arminius at Idistaviso in AD 16.

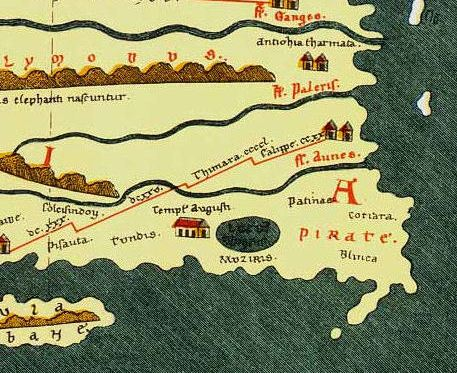
Muziris in the Chera Kingdom of Southern India, as shown in the Tabula Peutingeriana, with depiction of a temple of Augustus (Templum Augusti)

Rome also experienced loss to the south in Arabia Felix against the Kingdom of Saba (in modern Yemen). In 26 BC Augustus had Gaius Aelius Gallus, prefect of Egypt, invade South Arabia with Roman troops supported by Jewish and Nabataean Arab auxiliaries. They aimed to conquer the Sabaeans or force them to accept client state status so that Rome could gain a share of their profitable trade with India. Roman forces laid siege to Marib, but retreated to Hejaz (under allied Nabataean control) after a shortage of water supplies. This campaign might have been part of a failed attempt to flank the Parthian Empire, considering how Augustus encouraged Tiridates II of Parthia to invade Mesopotamia and reclaim his throne the same year.

Augustus ordered Gaius Petronius, Aelius Gallus's successor as prefect of Egypt, to invade Aethiopia, after Queen Amanirenas of the Kingdom of Kush (in modern Sudan) invaded Roman Egypt in 24 BC and sacked Aswan and Philae. The Romans counterattacked, sacking Napata in Nubia before withdrawing, but Amanirenas invaded Egypt again in 22 BC and threatened Primis (modern Qasr Ibrim). After Petronius withstood a Kushite assault, Amanirenas sent diplomats to negotiate a peace treaty with Augustus on the island of Samos. The treaty established Maharraqa as the new border with Kush, lessened the amount of Roman tribute gathered from Kush, and guaranteed peaceful trade relations between Egypt and Nubia. In the Maghreb of North Africa, Cossus Cornelius Lentulus quashed a rebellion of the Gaetuli against Juba II of Mauretania in AD 6.

== Death and succession ==
=== The search for an heir ===
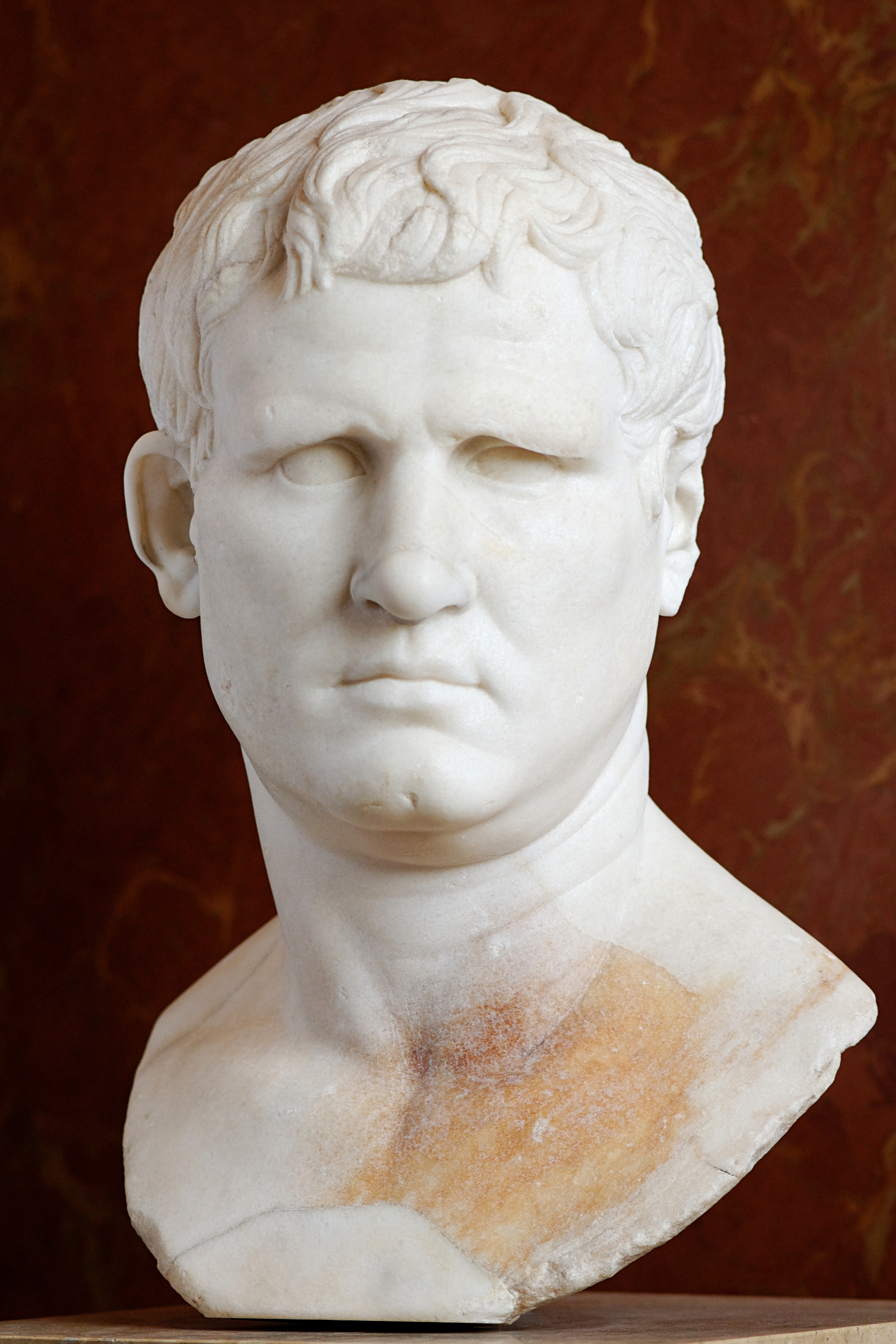
Left: A Roman bust of Julia the Elder, Augustus's daughter, housed in the Musée Saint-Raymond, France
Right: A Roman bust of Marcus Vipsanius Agrippa, Augustus's son-in-law and confidant, the Louvre Museum, Paris, France

Augustus's illness in 23 BC accentuated the problem of succession. (Note: The cause of Augustus's health problems is not clear. It may have been feigned or psychosomatic; if real, some scholars have suggested a liver abscess.) To ensure stability without triggering fears of monarchy, he needed to designate a meritful heir. Some historians argue that he favored his nephew Marcellus, who had married Augustus's daughter Julia, while others argue that he preferred Marcus Agrippa, who was Augustus's second in charge and a respected military commander. Two years after Marcellus died, Augustus had Julia marry Agrippa in 21 BC. This union produced five children, three sons and two daughters. In 18 BC, Agrippa was granted a five-year appointment to the eastern provinces with proconsular imperium and also the tribunicia potestas that Augustus possessed. This grant showed Augustus's favor but upset some conservative senators.

Augustus adopted his grandsons Gaius and Lucius as his heirs and served as consul in 5 and 2 BC to establish their political careers. Gaius was consul for AD 1, with Augustus having him wait until he turned 21, (Note: Gaius Caesar had won election as consul in 6 BC. Patricia Southern argues that Augustus was testing public reaction to the 14-year-old Gaius as consul. Augustus insisted that this age was suitable enough, since Augustus had become consul at age 19 as Octavian, just before forming the triumvirate.) while Lucius died before his designated consulship. Augustus also showed favor to his stepsons Tiberius and Drusus, granting them public offices while seeming to prefer Drusus. Tiberius married Agrippa's eldest daughter, Vipsania Agrippina, while Drusus married Augustus's niece Antonia. After Agrippa died in 12 BC, Augustus ordered Tiberius to divorce Vipsania for the widowed Julia. Drusus and Antonia's marriage was considered an unbreakable affair, whereas Vipsania was deemed less important. Drusus died in 9 BC.

=== Tiberius, heir to Augustus ===
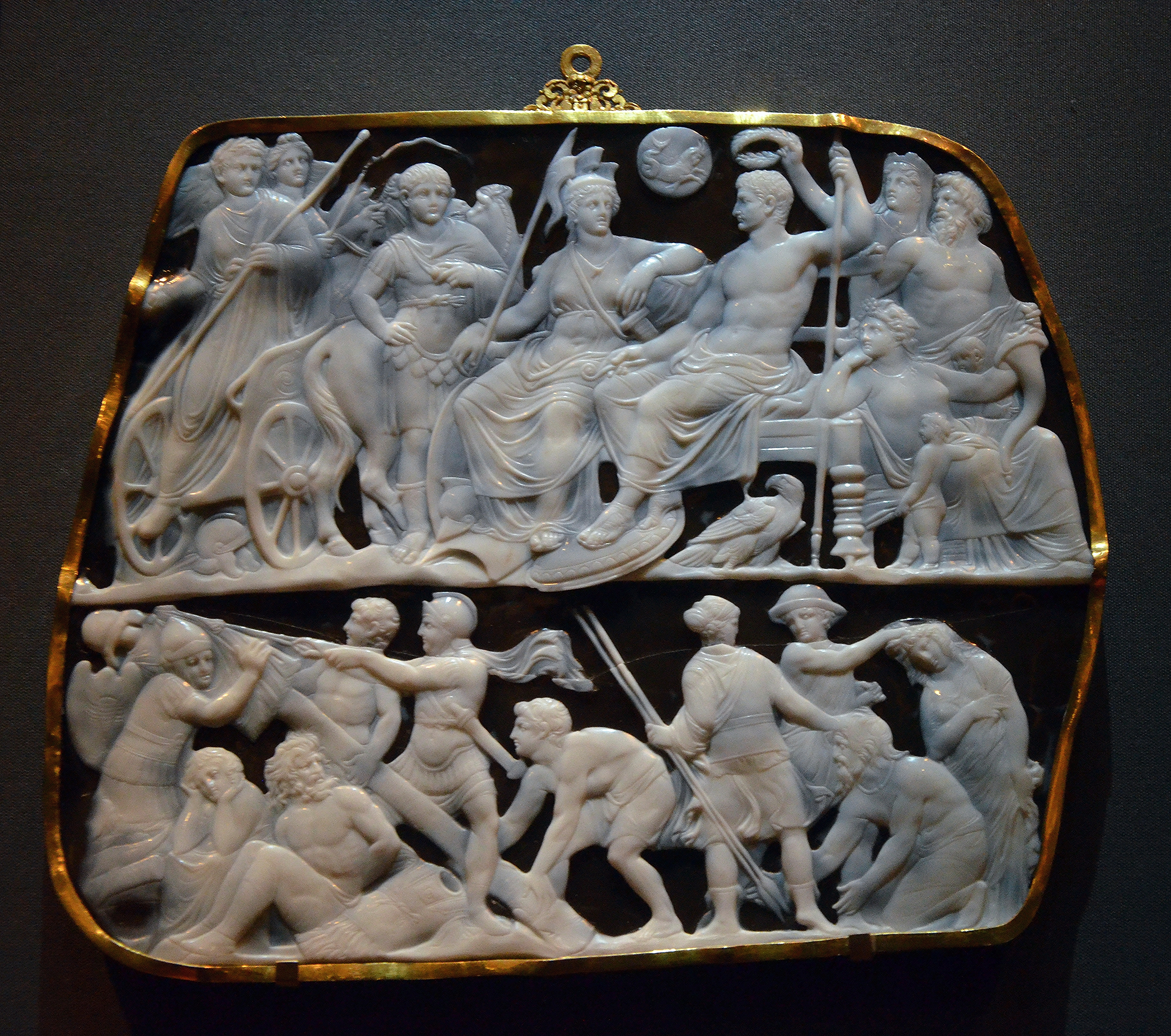
The Gemma Augustea, a two-layered sardonyx depicting Augustus seated next to the goddess Roma, with Augustus equated as Jupiter as he looks on at a figure riding in a chariot (likely his heir Tiberius celebrating his triumph for victories in Germania), 9–12 AD, Kunsthistorisches Museum, Vienna

Tiberius shared in Augustus's tribunician powers from 6 BC but shortly thereafter withdrew into retirement, reportedly wanting no further role in politics. A failing marriage with Julia and envy for her sons Gaius and Lucius could have contributed to Tiberius's departure. Augustus exiled his daughter for adultery in 2 BC, but inducted his grandsons into the college of priests at an early age and introduced them to the army in Gaul.

After the deaths of Lucius in AD 2 and Gaius in AD 4, Augustus recalled Tiberius to Rome in June AD 4 and adopted him, on the condition that Tiberius adopt his nephew Germanicus. This continued the tradition of presenting at least two generations of heirs. In AD 4 Tiberius was also granted the tribunicia potestas and a proconsular post in Germany; for his efforts there and in Illyricum, he eventually triumphed. By AD 13, he had received the imperium maius proconsulare equalling that of Augustus.

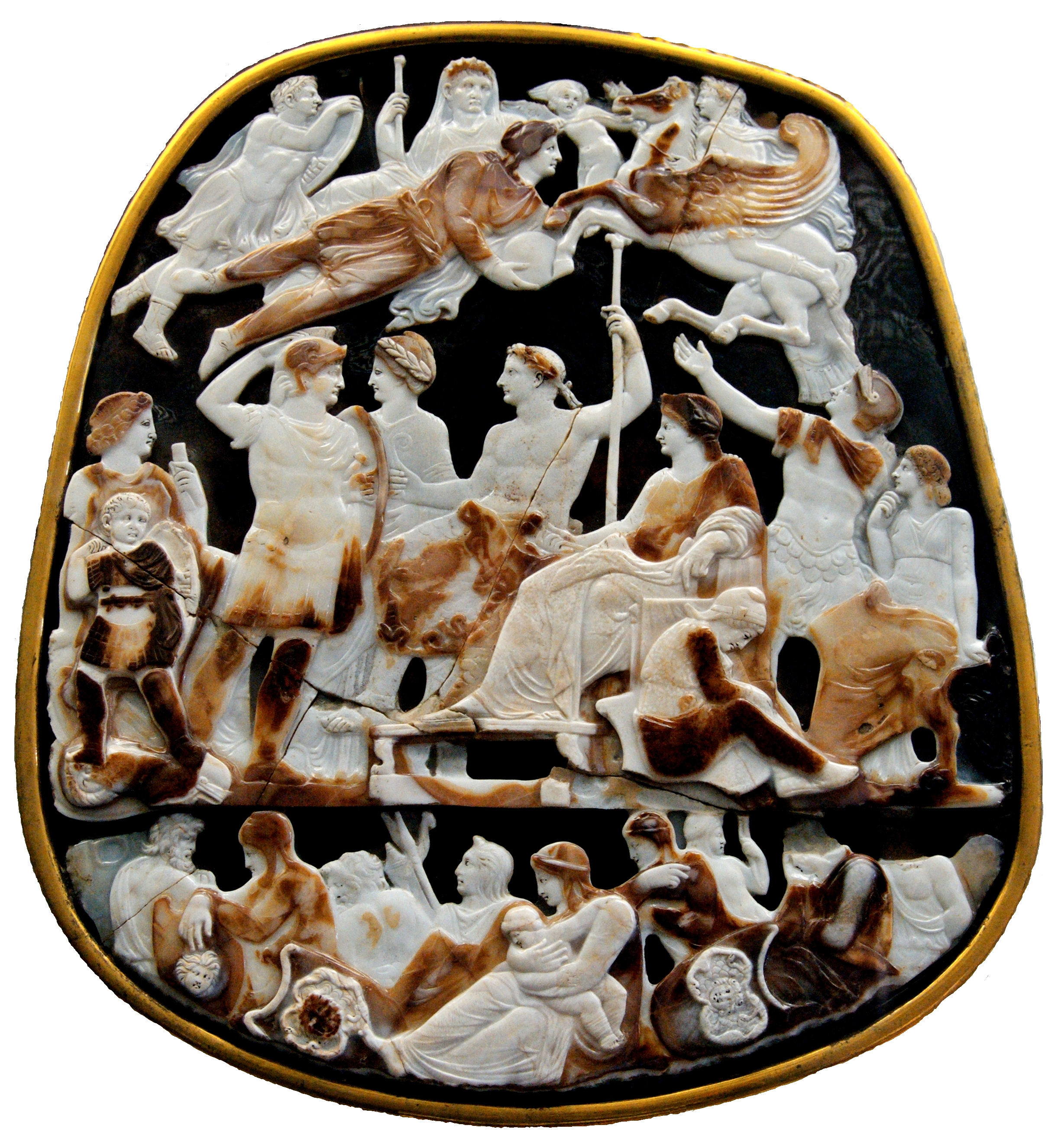
The deified Augustus hovers over Tiberius and other Julio-Claudians in the Great Cameo of France, 1st century AD

The only other possible claimant was Agrippa Postumus, Augustus's youngest grandson. However, Augustus had exiled him to Sorrento in AD 6 and then to Planasia in AD 7. The Senate made Agrippa's banishment permanent, and Augustus officially disowned him for his lack of good character and alleged involvement in a conspiracy. After Tiberius succeeded Augustus, he was most likely the one who had Agrippa killed in exile.

=== Death of Augustus ===
On 19 August AD 14, Augustus died at Nola, where his father had died. Roman historians Tacitus and Cassius Dio claimed his wife Livia poisoned him. Many historians dismiss the alleged poisoning, however, as a fabrication to discredit her son Tiberius. If poisoning is accepted, Livia may have supplied a poisoned fig to assist death. Augustus's health had declined in the months before his death and he had prepared for a smooth transition in power to Tiberius.

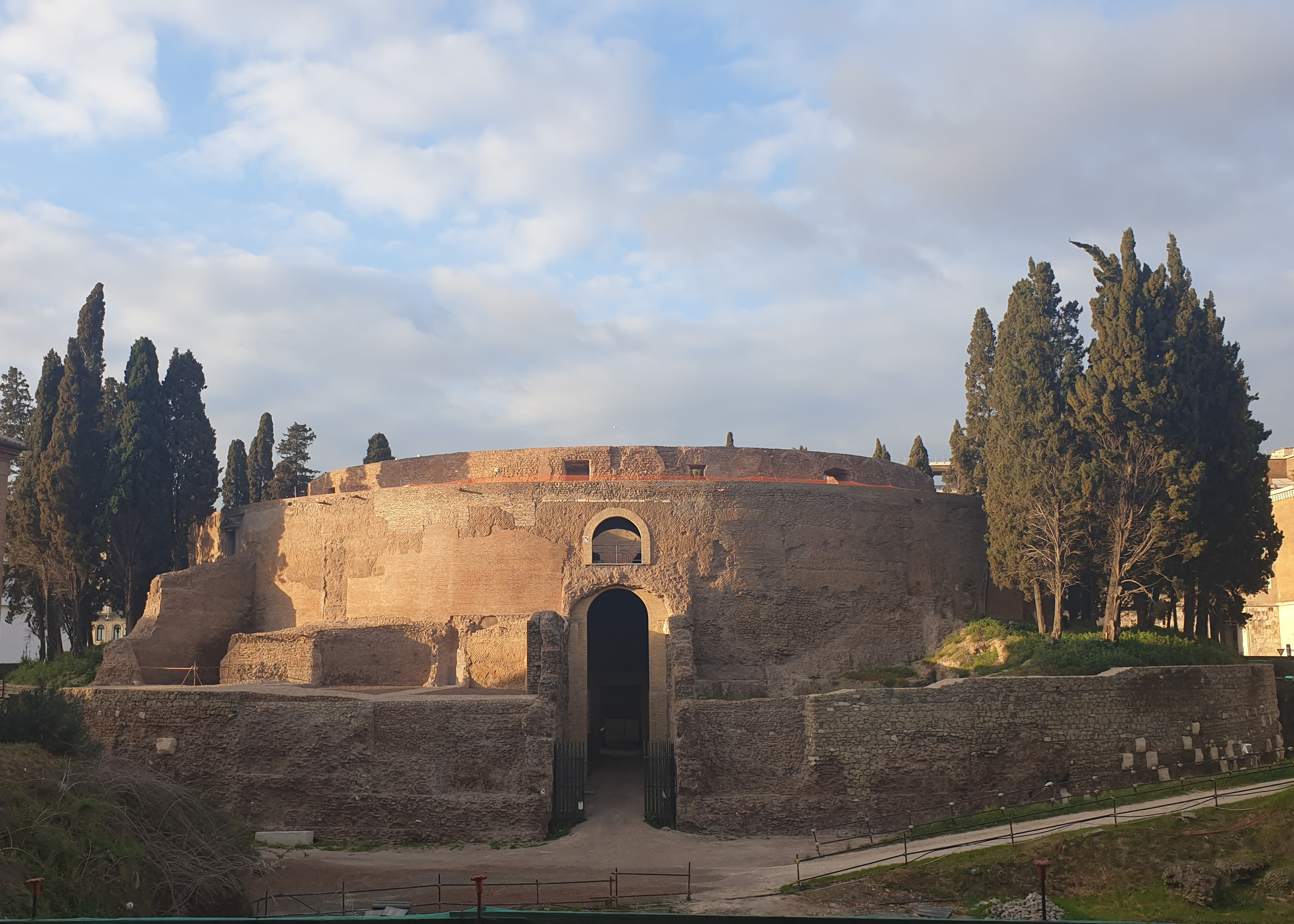
The Mausoleum of Augustus restored, 2021

Augustus's famous last words were, "Have I played the part well? Then applaud as I exit" (Acta est fabula, plaudite). A large procession accompanied Augustus's body from Nola to Rome, with all business closed on his funeral. Tiberius and his son Drusus delivered the eulogy while standing atop two rostra. Augustus's body was coffin-bound and cremated on a pyre close to his mausoleum.

=== Deification ===
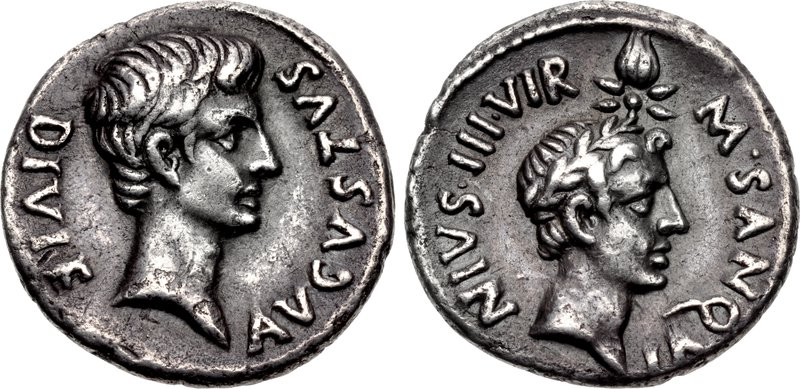
A coin of Augustus struck at Rome in 17 BC depicting Augustus on the obverse and the deified Julius Caesar beneath Caesar's comet on the reverse

On 17 September 27 BC the Senate proclaimed Augustus to have joined the company of the gods and the deified Julius Caesar as a member of the Roman pantheon. People in Rome's eastern provinces had worshipped Octavian as a living deity since his victory at Actium. There was limited worship of him in some western provinces, primarily at the Sanctuary of the Three Gauls in Lugdunum (Lyon, France) and at Ara Ubiorum in Oppidum Ubiorum (Cologne, Germany), but not at Rome where such worship remained taboo. Only his genius (spirit) was allowed worship there.

== Legacy ==
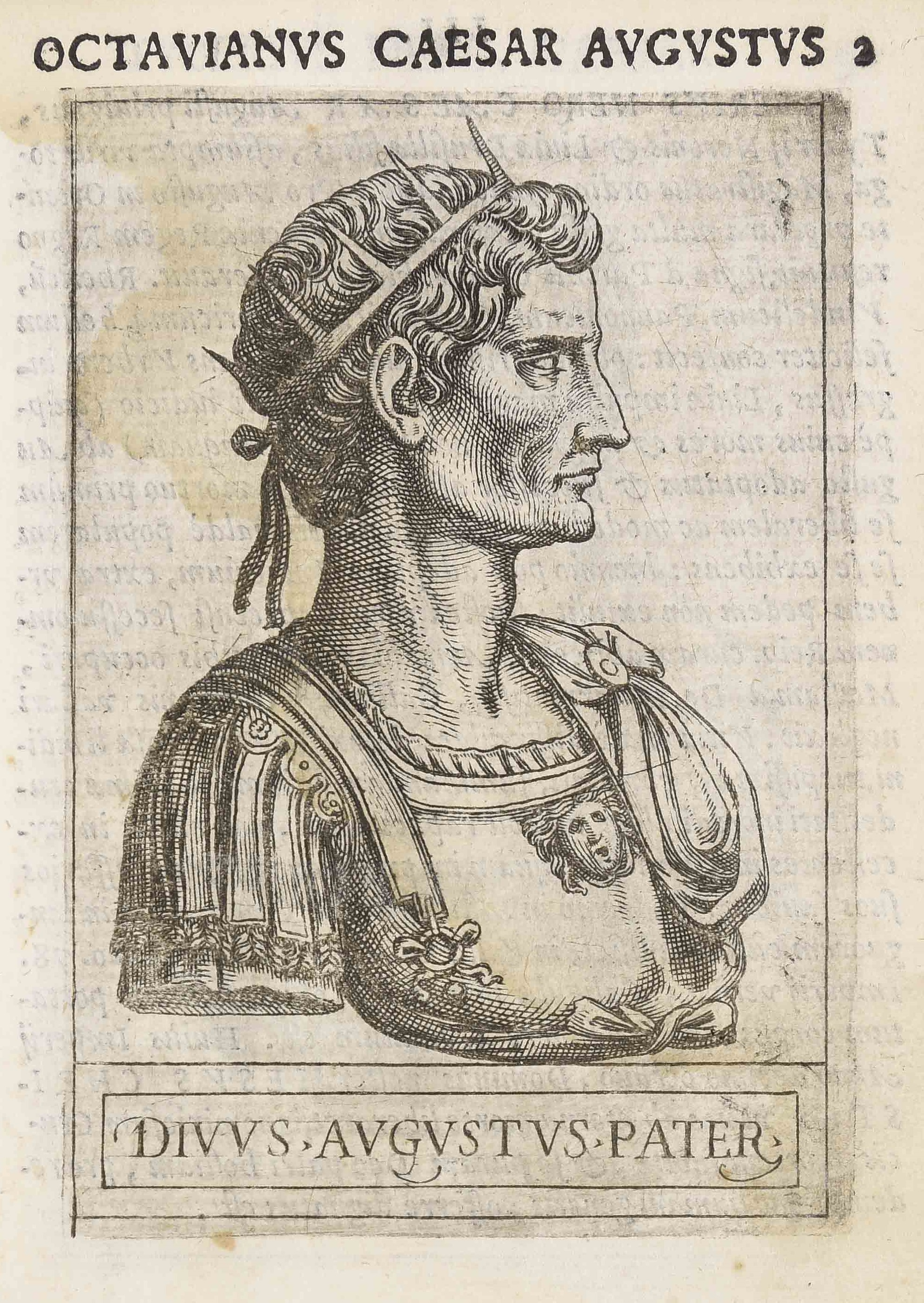
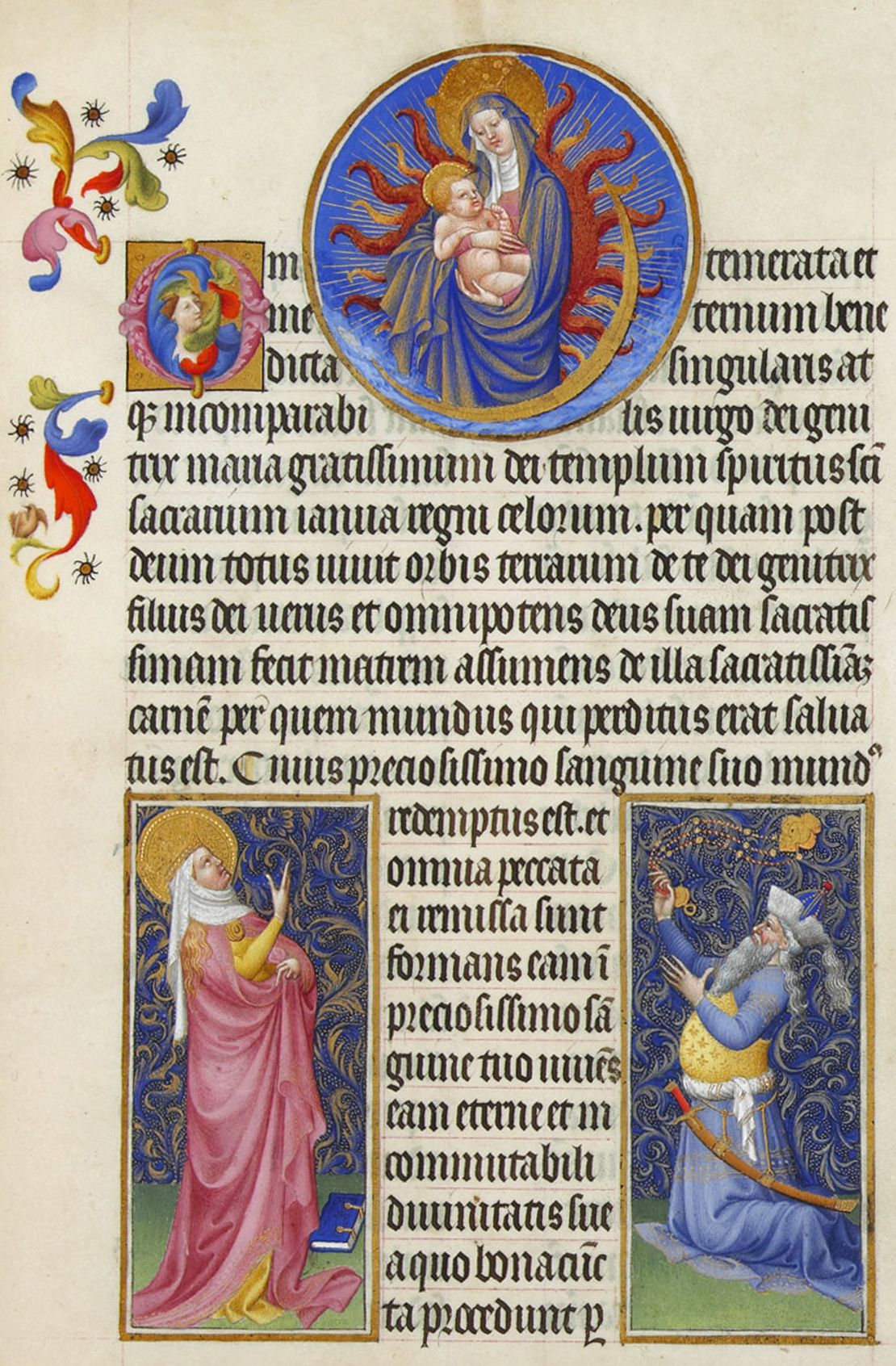
Left: Augustus in a copper engraving by Giovanni Battista Cavalieri; from the book Romanorum Imperatorum effigies (1583), preserved in the Municipal Library of Trento (Italy)
Right: From the Très Riches Heures du Duc de Berry (1412–1416), the Virgin Mary and Child (top), the prophetess Sibyl Tivoli (bottom left) and Augustus (bottom right). The likeness of Augustus is that of the Byzantine emperor Manuel II Palaiologos.

=== Overview ===
Augustus created a regime that maintained relative peace and prosperity for two centuries, initiating the celebrated Pax Romana (or Pax Augusta), though the Augustan golden age myth may obscure the complicated political challenges faced by Augustus. His regime laid the foundations of a concept of universal monarchy in the Byzantine and Holy Roman Empires down to their dissolutions in 1453 and 1806, respectively. Later Romans viewed his reign favorably, embodied by the Senate's formal wish to every emperor after Trajan that they "be more fortunate than Augustus and better than Trajan". This positive overall image was also helped by his successors copying many of Augustus's policies and forms of self-promotion, which modern research calls imitatio Augusti.

The surname Caesar and the title augustus became permanent titles of Roman rulers for fourteen centuries after Augustus's death, used in Rome and Constantinople following the Empire's division. Caesar formed the root of later regnal titles such as the German kaiser and Russian czar. Emperors preferred his title of civilis princeps for three centuries until they adopted the title domini ('lords'), beginning with Diocletian. His adoptive name Imperator ('victorious general') served as the etymological root of the word 'emperor', though it did not possess this connotation in Augustus's lifetime. The emperors alone held the office of pontifex maximus until the fall of the Western Roman Empire, after which the papacy adopted it.

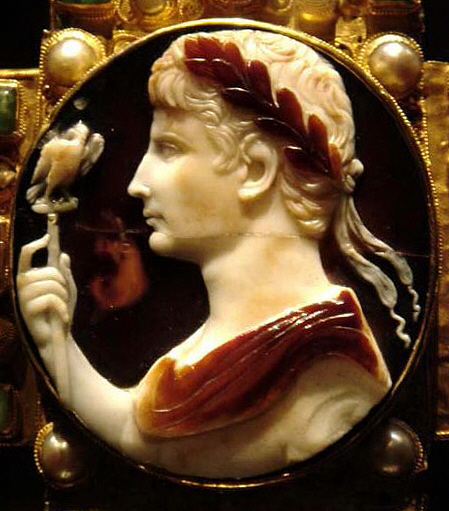
The Roman cameo of Augustus at the center of the medieval Cross of Lothair, housed in the Aachen Cathedral Treasury

=== Written works ===
Augustus composed an account of his achievements, the Res Gestae Divi Augusti, to be inscribed in bronze in front of his mausoleum. Copies of the text were inscribed throughout the empire upon his death. The Latin inscriptions, along with Greek translations, were inscribed on many public edifices, and historian Theodor Mommsen called them the "queen of inscriptions". The Res Gestae is Augustus's only surviving major work, though he is also known to have composed poems entitled "Sicilia", "Epiphanus", and "Ajax", an autobiography of 13 books, a philosophical treatise, and a written rebuttal to Marcus Brutus's Eulogy of Cato. Augustus's private letters also reveal facts about his personal life. The poet Martial preserved a sexually crude poem allegedly written by Octavian during the Perusine War, which pokes fun at Mark Antony, his wife Fulvia, and his mistress Glaphyra. Pliny the Elder suggested that Augustus displayed and finished Marcus Agrippa's world map publicly exhibited in the Porticus Vipsania. This map would later form the basis of various medieval world maps.

In his Res Gestae, Augustus defined the relative peace established by his reign as a peace "born of victories" (parta victoriis pax) in the civil wars, and Augustan artwork incorporates this theme. This peace ensured Romans and subjugated peoples within their Empire upheld a cohesive social pact: the latter would relinquish their sovereignty and pay taxes in exchange for the preservation of their customs and the protection of Rome. By boasting of his many conquests, the Res Gestae emphasizes the same code of honor found in Republican funerary inscriptions such as those of the Scipios, a key element in elevating the political reputation of Roman families.

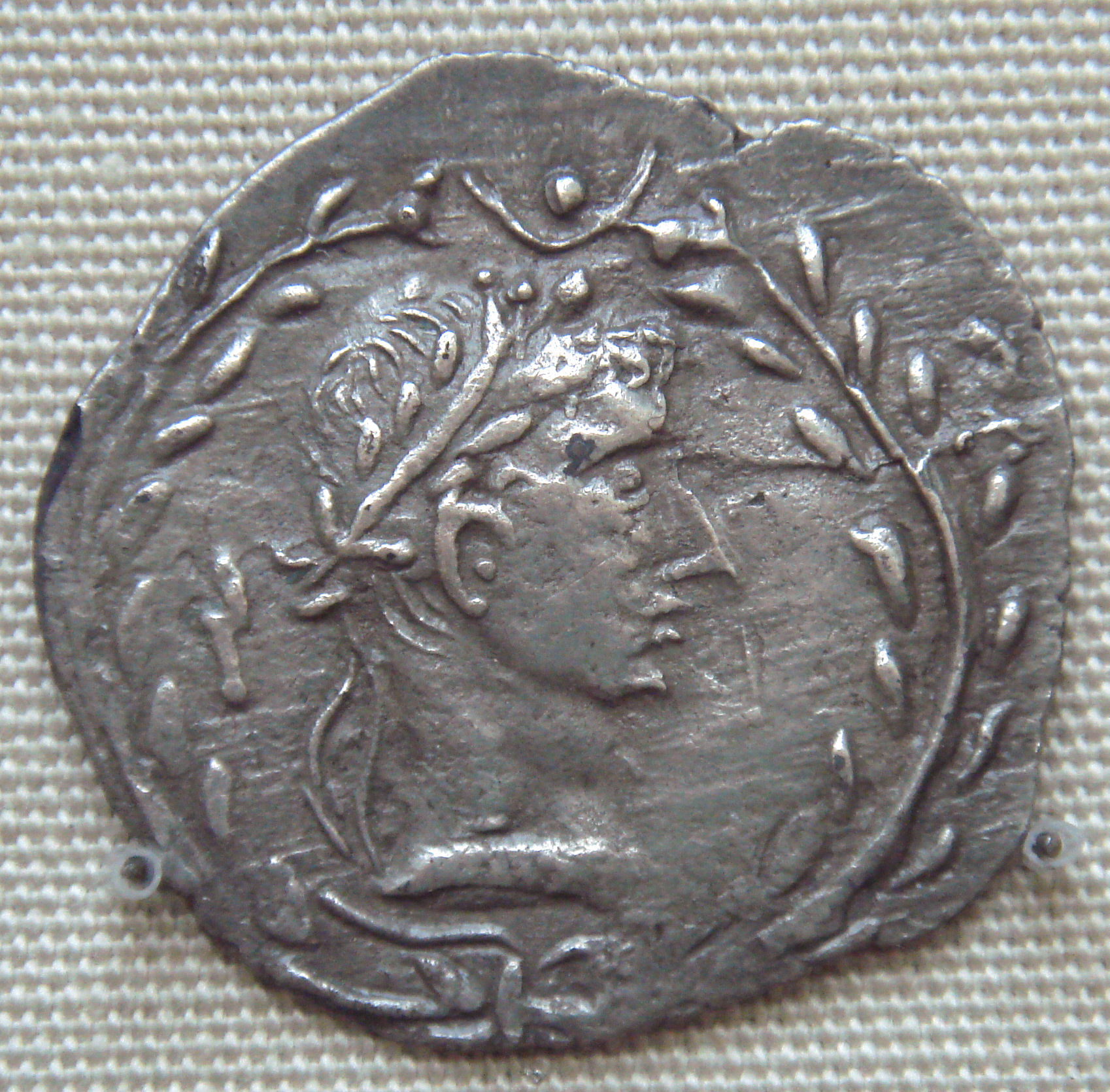
Coin of the Himyarite Kingdom in the southern Arabian peninsula, in imitation of coins of Augustus, 1st century AD

=== Enduring institutions ===
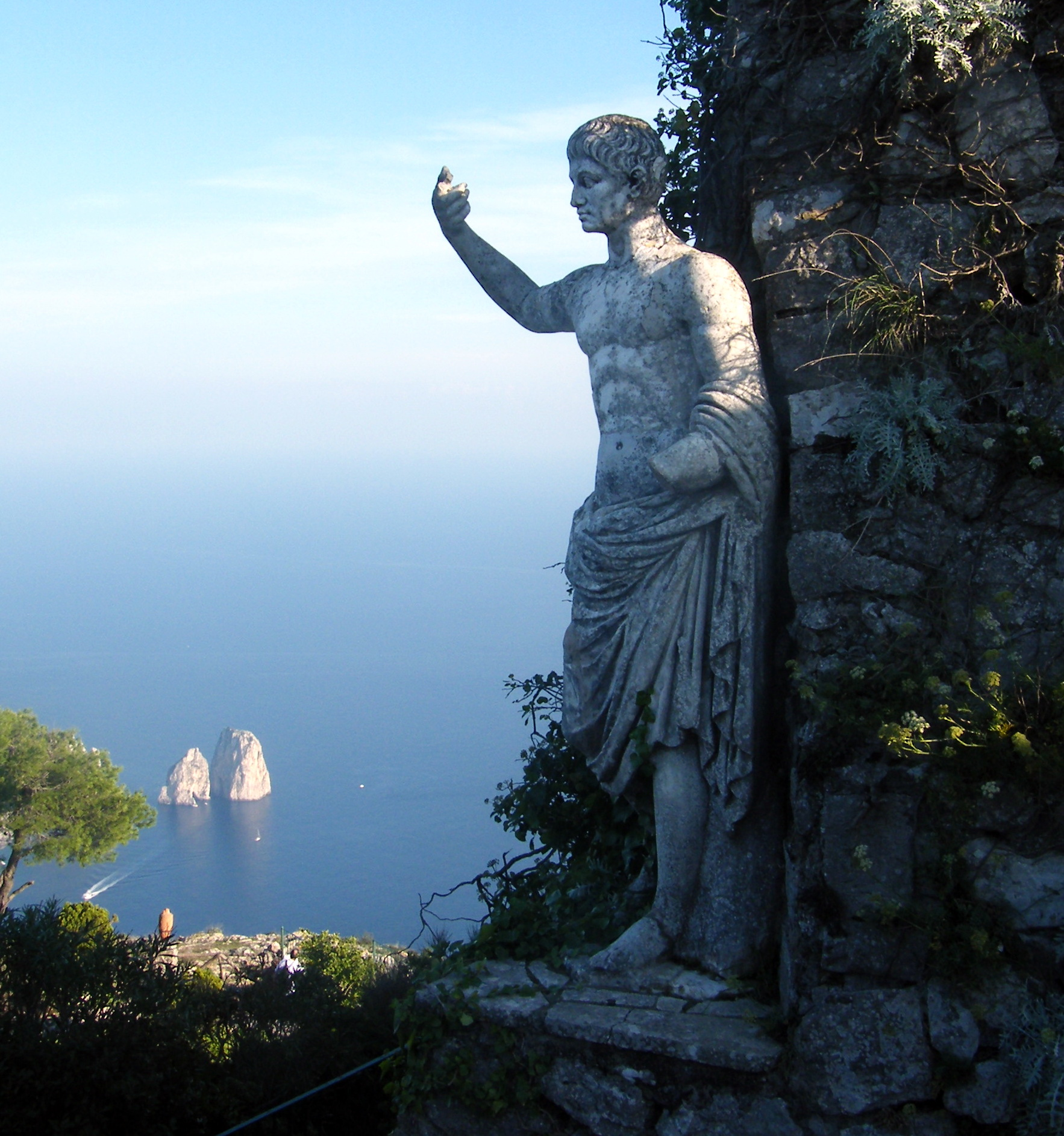
Statue of Augustus at Monte Solaro on the island of Capri in Campania, Italy, overlooking the Gardens of Augustus

Augustus thoroughly transformed the city of Rome, creating a permanent police force, firefighting force, and praefectus ('municipal prefect'). Established in AD 6 and based on previous firefighting services established in 22 and 7 BC, the vigiles was a combined fire brigade and police force divided into cohorts of 500 to 1,000 men each, with seven units assigned to fourteen divided city sectors. A praefectus vigilum ('prefect of the watch') was put in charge of the vigiles, whereas vicomagistri officials had previously been in charge of each district following the fire of 7 BC. Augustus created a standing army, fixed at a size of 28 legions of about 170,000 soldiers, reduced from 60 legions at the end of the civil wars in 30 BC. This was supported by many auxiliary units of 500 non-citizen soldiers each, often recruited from recently conquered areas.

With his finances securing the maintenance of roads throughout Italy, Augustus installed an official system of relay stations overseen by a military officer known as the praefectus vehiculorum. Besides speeding communication in Italy, his extensive road construction allowed Roman armies to march swiftly across the country. In AD 6 Augustus established the aerarium militare, donating 170 million sesterces to the new military treasury that provided for both active and retired soldiers.

One of Augustus's most enduring institutions was the establishment of the Praetorian Guard in 27 BC, commanded by two praetorian prefects (later one) after Augustus created this office in 2 BC. Originally a personal bodyguard unit on the battlefield, the praetorians evolved into an imperial guard as well as an important political force in Rome. They served the emperors into the early 4th century.

=== Revenue reforms ===
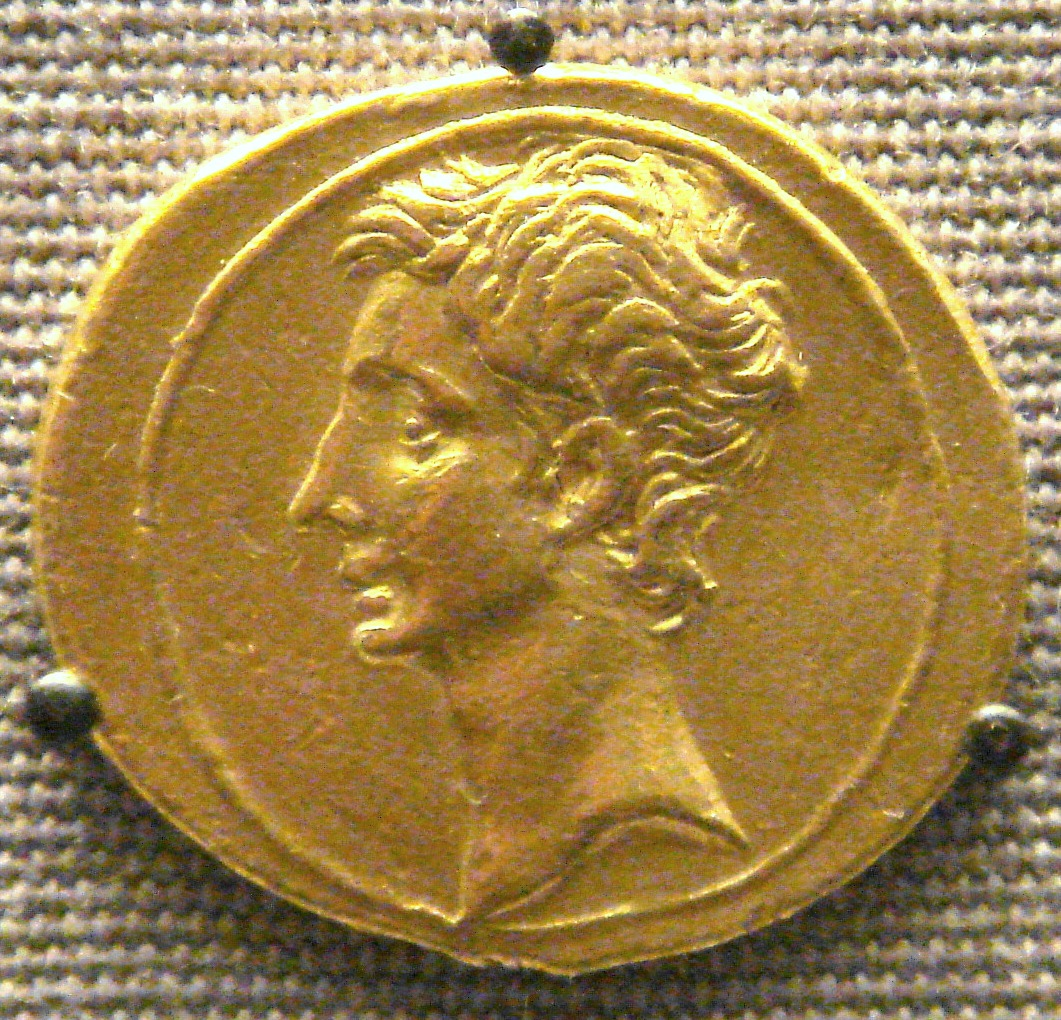
Aureus of Octavian, c. 30 BC, British Museum

Augustus's tax reforms greatly impacted the subsequent success of the Empire, bringing it under direct taxation from Rome. This increased and stabilized Rome's revenues from its territories and regularized the financial relationship between Rome and its provinces, avoiding provincial resentments with arbitrary exaction. An equally important reform was the abolition of tax farming. The publicani, Republican era private tax farmers, were infamous for their depredations and great wealth, so they were replaced by salaried tax collectors.

Under Augustus, the measures of taxation were determined by censuses with fixed quotas for each province. Citizens of Rome and Italy paid indirect taxes, while direct taxes were exacted from the provinces. Indirect taxes included a 4% tax on the price of slaves, a 1% tax on goods sold at auction, and a 5% tax on the inheritance of estates valued at over 100,000 sesterces by persons other than the next of kin. Due to protest from equestrians, the suffect consuls for 9 AD modified and lessened penalties in the Lex Papia Poppaea that affected the inheritance of estates by unmarried or childless individuals, though it continued to generate revenues with properties of the deceased seized by the state.

Augustus's annexation of Egypt allowed him to divert its immense wealth for imperial purposes. Considered Augustus's private property rather than a province, it became part of each succeeding emperor's patrimonium. Instead of a legate or proconsul, Augustus installed a prefect from the equestrian class to administer Egypt and maintain its lucrative seaports. This position became the highest political achievement for any equestrian besides becoming praetorian prefect. Gold and silver found in the Ptolemaic royal treasury was melted down for coins. In his will, Augustus left money to his family, 43 million sesterces to the Roman people, 1,000 sesterces to every praetorian, 500 sesterces to every soldier in urban cohorts, and 300 sesterces to each soldier.

=== Month of August ===
In 8 BC, the Roman month of Sextilis (or Sextilus) was renamed August (Latin: Augustus) after Augustus. Augustus chose Sextilis as it was the month of his first consulship and of his various victories. In comparison, the month of July (Latin: Iulius) in the Julian calendar was named after Julius Caesar, the only other month in the Roman calendar named after a Roman.

=== Building projects ===
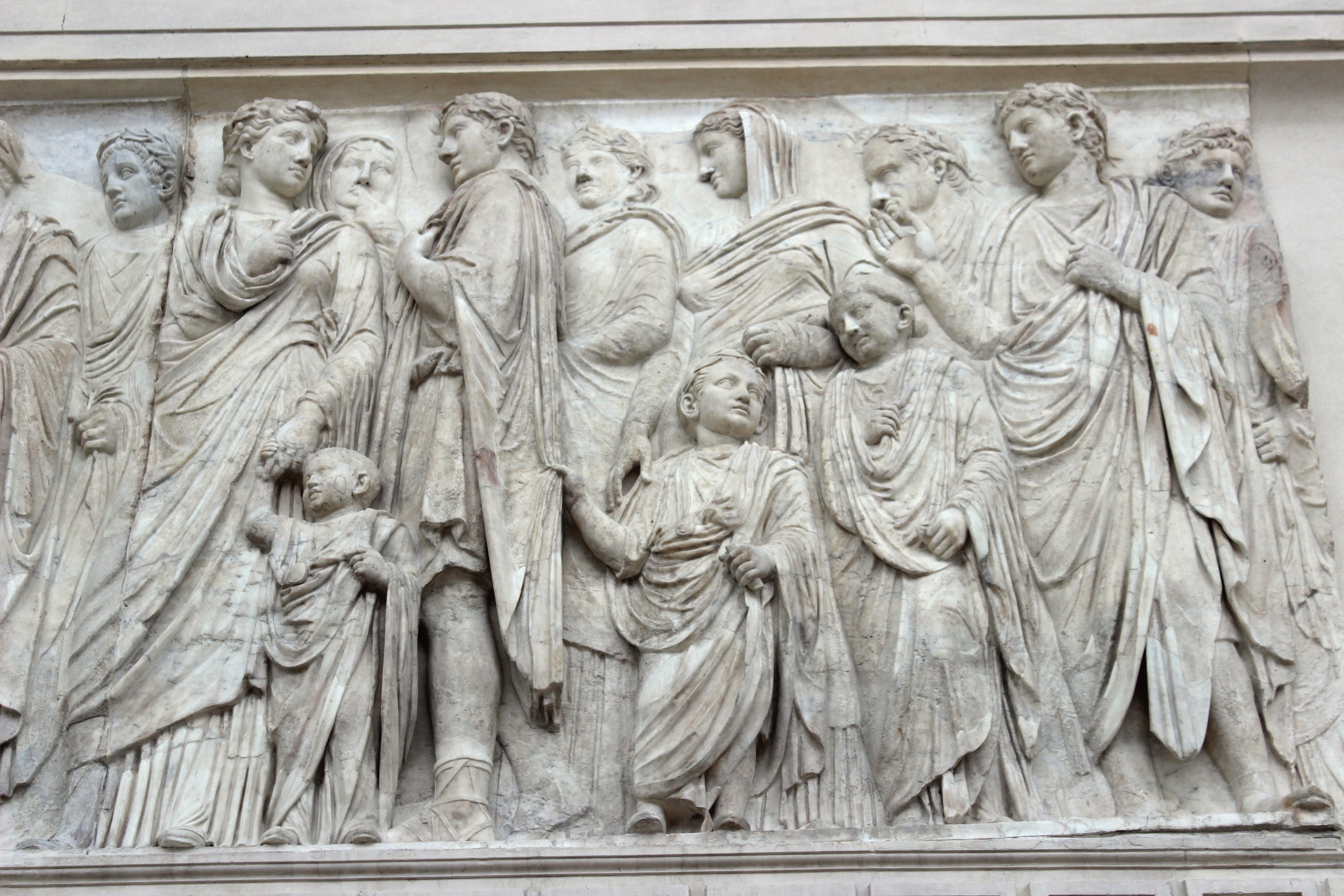
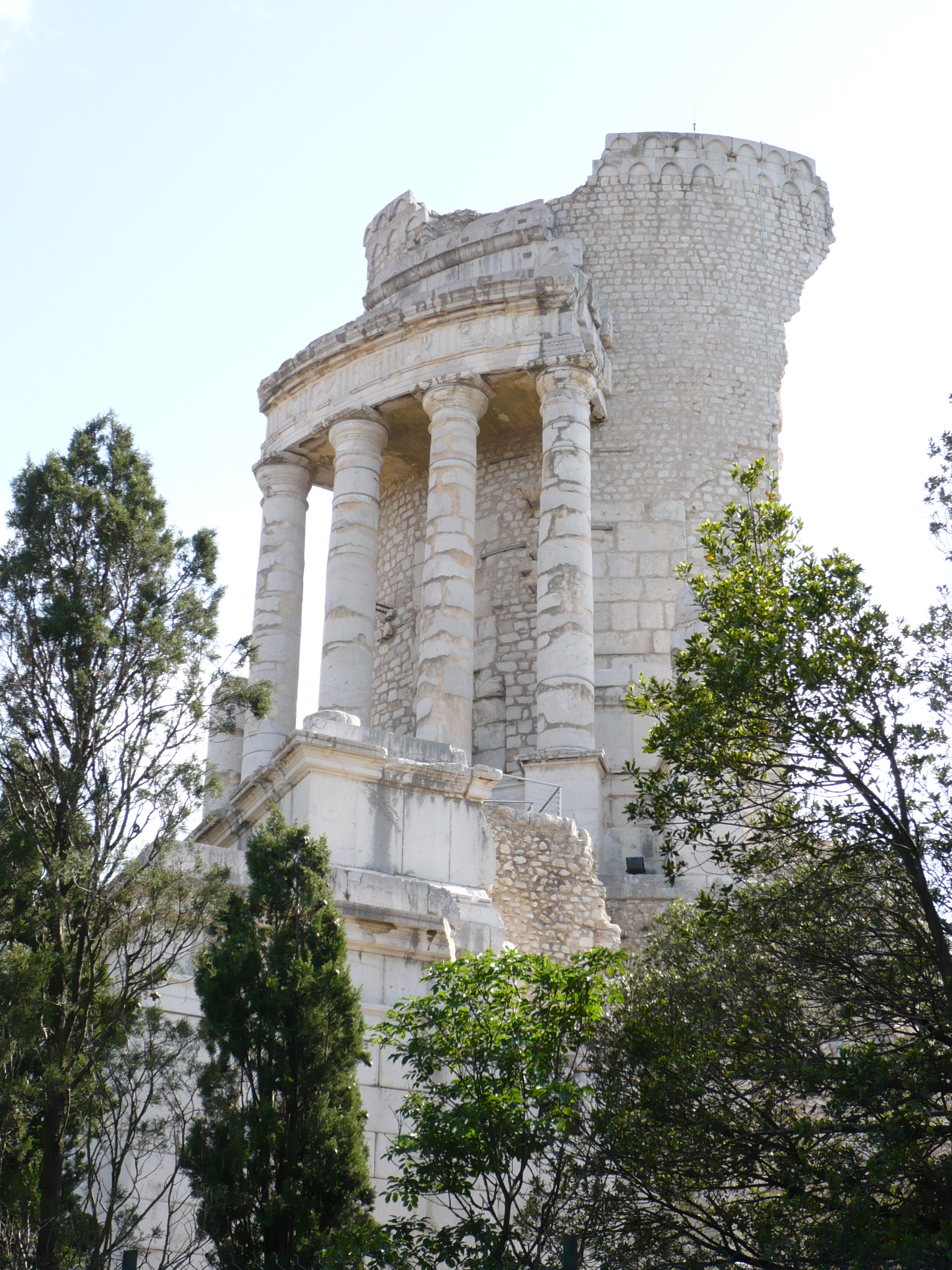
Left: Sculpted reliefs on the south side of the Ara Pacis ('Altar of Peace') in Rome showing unidentified members of the imperial family, dedicated to the Pax Romana, decreed by the Roman Senate in 13 BC, and completed on 30 January 9 BC with Augustus attending its dedication ceremony
Right: The Tropaeum Alpium (Trophy of Augustus), a victory monument built by Augustus at La Turbie, France (near Monaco) in honor of the Roman conquest of Rhetia and the Alps

==== Remodeling of Rome ====
On his deathbed, Augustus boasted that he converted Rome from a city of bricks into one of marble. Marble could be found in Roman buildings before Augustus, but it was not extensively used as a building material until his reign. (Note: This transformation of Rome with new marble edifices did not apply to the Subura slums, which were still as rickety and fire-prone as ever.) He left a mark on the monumental topography of the city's center, as well as on the Campus Martius with the Ara Pacis (Altar of Peace) and monumental sundial, whose central gnomon was an obelisk taken from Egypt. The relief sculptures decorating the Ara Pacis visually augment Augustus's triumphs outlined in the Res Gestae. Its reliefs depict praetorians, the Vestals, and the citizenry of Rome. The Corinthian order of architectural style originating from ancient Greece was the dominant architectural style in the age of Augustus. Suetonius once commented that Rome was unworthy of its status as an imperial capital, yet Augustus and Agrippa set out to dismantle this sentiment. They transformed the appearance of Rome upon the Greek model, incorporating both Classical and Hellenistic elements with many Athenian monuments as direct inspirations.

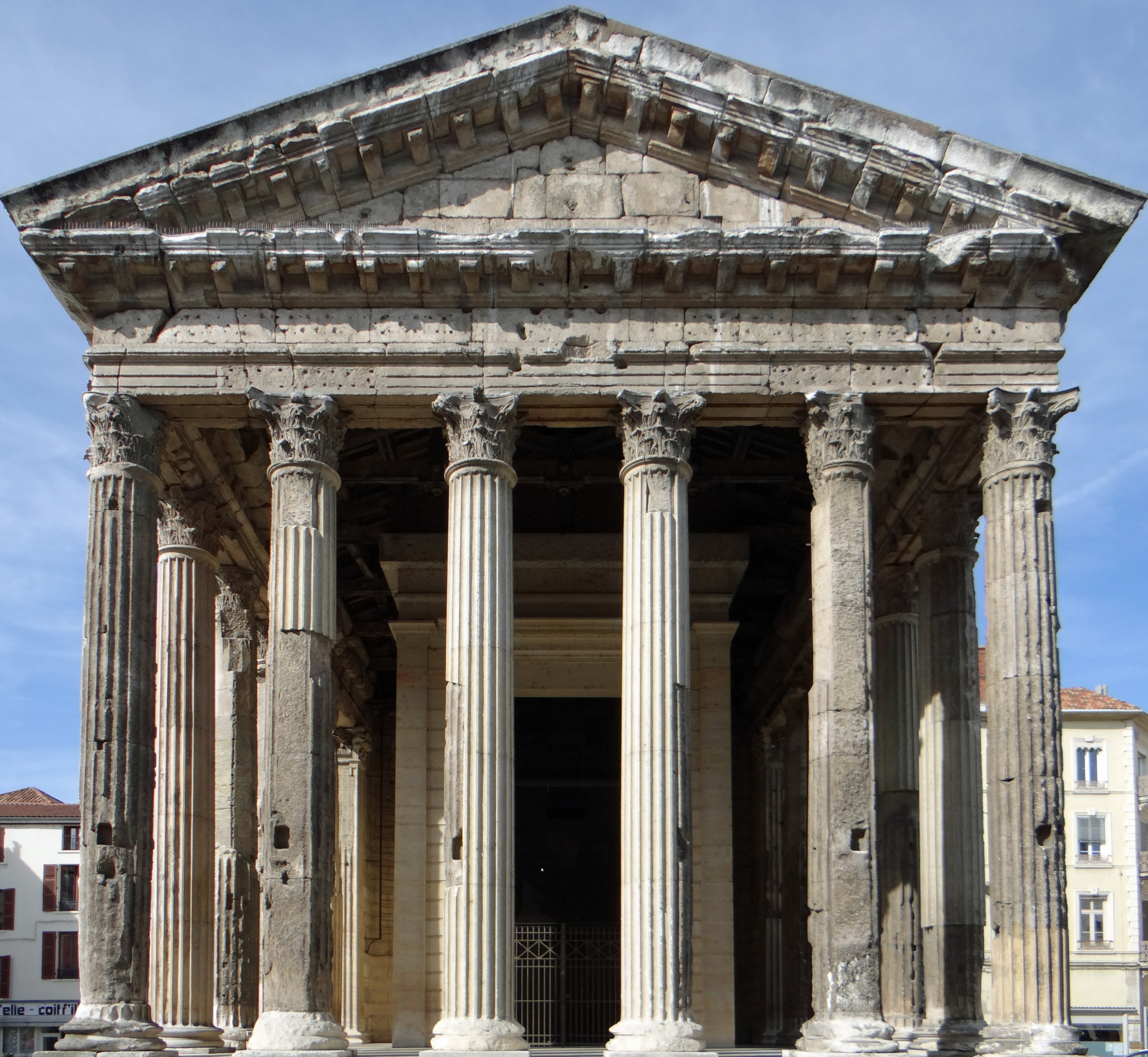
The Temple of Augustus and Livia in Vienne, France, late 1st century BC

Augustus had the temples of Caesar, Jupiter Tonans, and Apollo Palatinus erected, as well as the Baths of Agrippa and the Forum of Augustus with its Temple of Mars Ultor. He encouraged the establishment of the Theatre of Balbus and Agrippa's construction of the Pantheon, and funded additional projects in the name of others, often relations. Even his tomb in Rome was built before his death to house members of his family. To celebrate his victory at the Battle of Actium, the Arch of Augustus was built in 29 BC near the entrance of the Temple of Castor and Pollux, and widened in 19 BC to include a triple-arch design. He also completed projects left unfinished by Julius Caesar, such as the Curia Julia, the Forum of Caesar, and the Temple of Venus Genetrix. He rebuilt the Basilica Aemilia by 2 BC (previously burned down in a fire of 35 BC).

Augustus also provided grand spectacles in Rome. The amphitheater constructed by Statilius Taurus from 34 to 29 BC was the first stone amphitheater built in the city, and opened with gladiator games around the time Octavian staged shows of live combat and the first ever killing of a rhino and hippopotamus for entertainment in Rome. Augustus staged lion hunts in the Circus Maximus, temporarily flooded the Circus Flaminius for slaughtering crocodiles, and held gladiatorial bouts in the Saepta Julia. In 2 BC he also staged an elaborate mock naval battle, the naumachia Augusti, by creating an artificial lake on the west bank of the Tiber, its waters fed by a newly built aqueduct, the Aqua Alsietina that stretched for over twenty miles. In a lethal performance, the combatants reenacted the 480 BC Battle of Salamis between the Greek city-states led by Athens and the Persian Achaemenid Empire. (Note: Over two centuries later Dio wrote that some of the structures built for this occasion were still standing.)

==== Public works ====
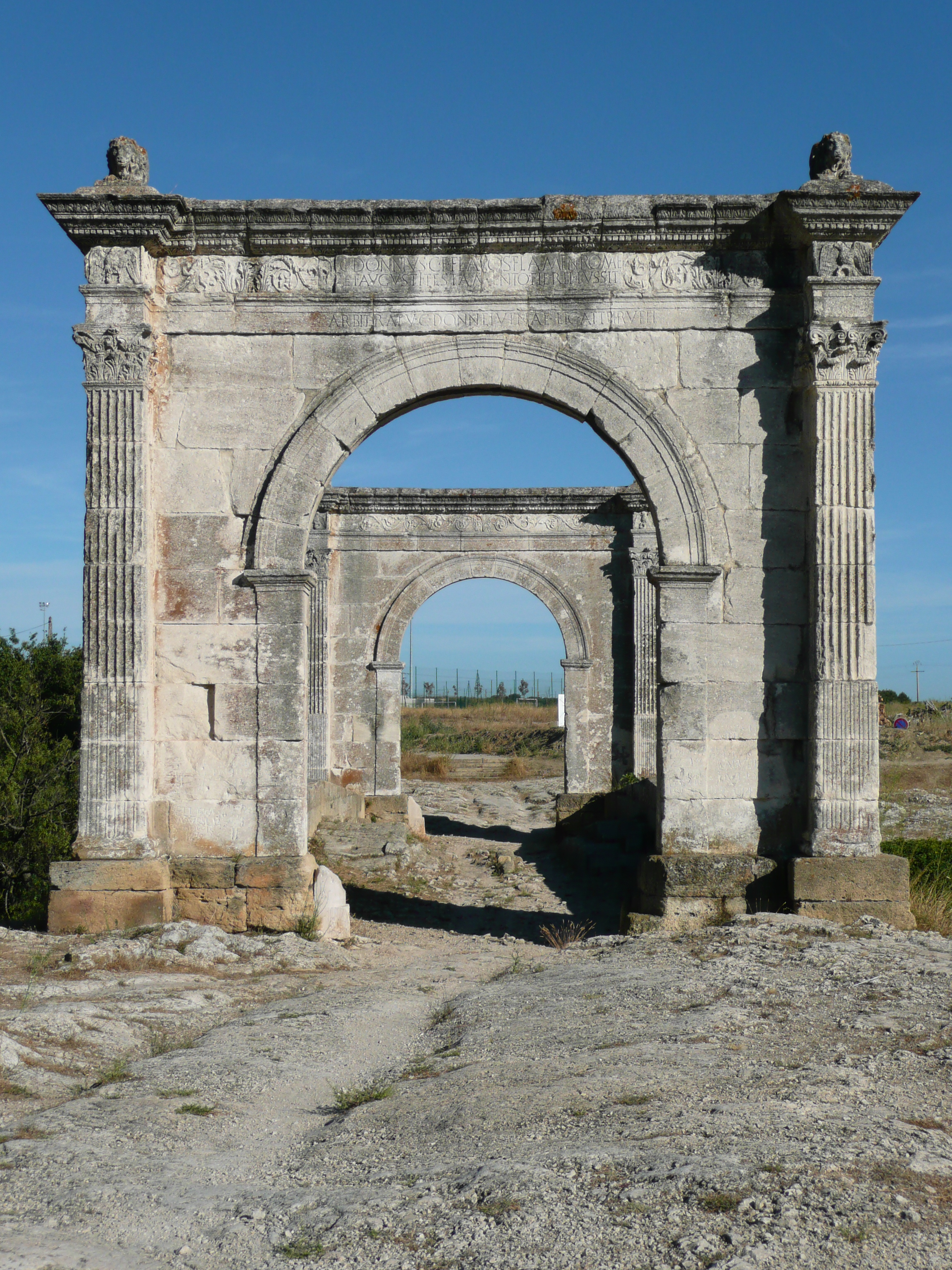
Remains of the Pont Flavien bridge along the Via Julia Augusta in Saint-Chamas, Bouches-du-Rhône, France

Augustus put Agrippa in charge of Rome's water supply, sanitation, drainage system, public baths, and roads. Agrippa had overseen these works when he served as aedile in 33 BC, and even privately funded them afterwards. In 33 BC he built the Aqua Julia aqueduct, along with new cisterns and water towers. After Agrippa's death in 12 BC, Augustus had to find a solution to maintain Rome's water supply system, and he arranged a system where the Senate designated three of its members as commissioners in charge of the water supply and repair of aqueducts.

During the triumvirate and early reign of Augustus, Agrippa oversaw the construction of new roads for military purposes to the Rhine frontier. Augustus created the senatorial commission of the curatores viarum ('supervisors for roads'), which worked with local officials and contractors to organize regular repairs to roads. Augustus repaired all bridges in Rome except the Milvian and Minucian ones, and paved the Via Flaminia between Rome and Ariminum. In his late reign, he tasked a commission of five senators, the curatores locorum publicorum iudicandorum ('Supervisors of Public Property'), with maintaining public buildings and temples.

==== Residences ====
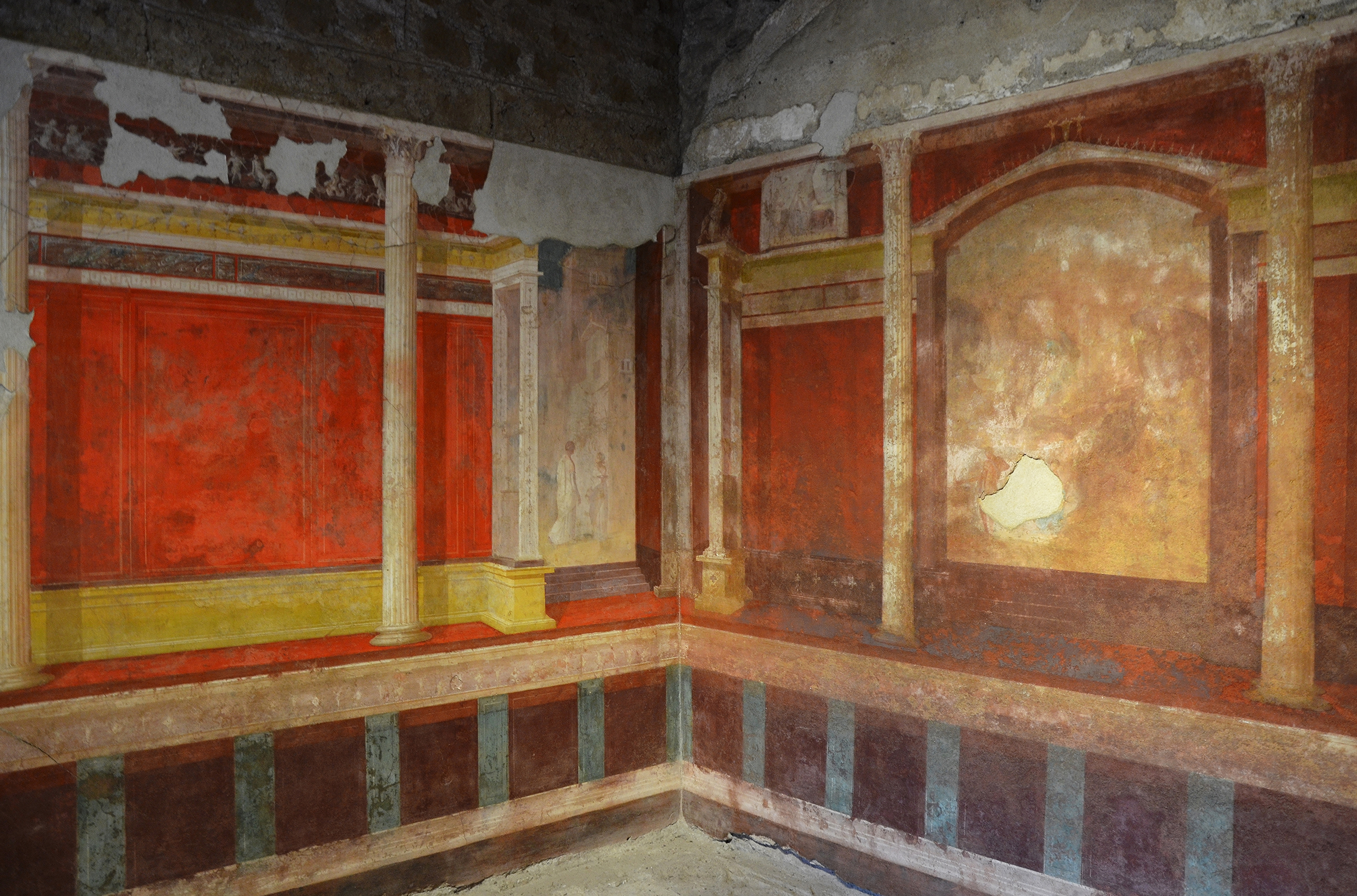
A corner of the lower cubiculum in the House of Augustus on the Palatine Hill in Rome, with Pompeian second style frescos

Augustus's official residence was the Domus Augusti ('House of Augustus') on the Palatine Hill, though its identification is not certain. According to Suetonius the home was somewhat modest, but if it was the Carettoni house west of the Palatine temple of Apollo, then Augustus's residence would have been substantially larger and more luxurious than literary sources admit. Augustus dedicated this temple to Apollo near his home in 28 BC, and he often appears on coinage wearing the civic crown with laurels highly associated with Apollo. The Domus Augusti is also located near the Casa Romuli ('House of Romulus'), purportedly that of Rome's legendary founder Romulus. The House of Livia is located nearby, though it is unclear if Augustus's wife lived there before his death.

Outside Rome, Augustus owned three countryside villas, which were not extravagant but had ornamental gardens. Augustus built the Palazzo a Mare palace on the island of Capri, where he hosted a sizable collection of fossils and what may have been dinosaur bones. At the Villa Giulia on the island of Ventotene, where Augustus exiled his daughter Julia, he constructed a sophisticated hypocaust central heating system for two large bathtubs and a caldarium hot plunge bath. Augustus's family home was a villa located in Nola, where he and his father died. This residence was probably the villa discovered at Somma Vesuviana.

== Critical analysis ==
=== Ancient and contemporary views ===
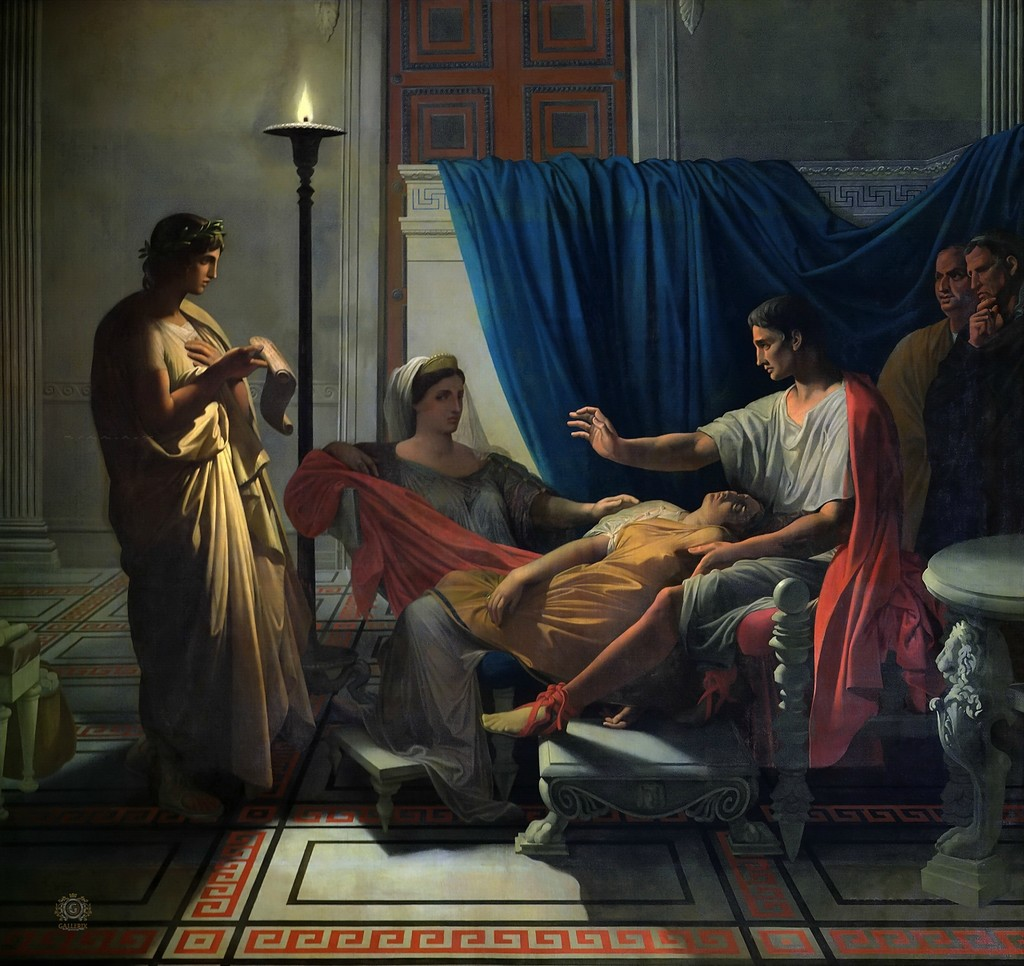
Virgil reading The Aeneid before Augustus, Livia and Octavia, by Jean-Auguste-Dominique Ingres, 1812, Musée des Augustins; Octavia the Younger allegedly fainted during a public reading of the Aeneid in Rome by Virgil, becoming emotionally overwhelmed during the passage about the death of her son Marcus Claudius Marcellus.

Writers throughout the ages have both praised and criticized Augustus. The contemporary Roman jurist Marcus Antistius Labeo, fond of the days of pre-Augustan republican liberty in which he had been born, openly criticized Augustus's regime. In his Annals, Tacitus wrote that Augustus had cunningly reduced Republican Rome to slavery and Tiberius had merely succeeded him as slaveholder. Tacitus believed that Emperor Nerva (r. 96–98) successfully joined principate and liberty. The 3rd-century historian Cassius Dio acknowledged Augustus as a benign, moderate ruler, but like most other post-Augustan historians viewed him as an autocrat. The 1st-century poet Lucan argued that Caesar's victory over Pompey and the death of Cato the Younger in 46 BC marked the end of traditional liberty in Rome.

Modern academics still debate the extent to which Augustus censored criticism of him. As triumvir, Octavian destroyed all public records dating from the Ides of March 44 BC to the defeat of Sextus Pompey in 36 BC, a convenient political move that appealed to popular resentment over the proscriptions. Augustan poets sometimes openly criticized the emperor, such as Propertius when he disapproved of the execution of prisoners during the Perusine War. There is no evidence that Augustus intervened directly in Virgil and Horace's poetry, and private letters suggest that he maintained genuine friendships with both. (Note: Some of Virgil and Horace's poetry has been interpreted as praising their patron Augustus as an upholder of moral justice, and for maintaining the Empire. In 19 BC Augustus may have defied Virgil's deathbed wishes to have the Aeneid burned, having the poet Lucius Varius Rufus preserve and publish it instead.) Octavian was Virgil's patron when the latter penned his Eclogues, which express the discontented views of impoverished farmers and landowners during the triumvirate. Yet around AD 8 Augustus had the poet Ovid exiled, and his literature banned. (Note: Ovid suggested that this was in reprisal for writing a poem and making a mistake, perhaps being a witness to a sexual scandal involving either Augustus's daughter Julia the Elder or his granddaughter Julia the Younger.)

Tacitus claimed that the discipline of history declined under Augustus due to historians flattering the emperor rather than by active suppression. Livy wrote his highly influential and encompassing History of Rome during Augustus's reign. Despite championing many of Augustus's views, Livy wrote independently and Tacitus later claimed that Augustus lightly criticized Livy for glorifying Pompey's career. Augustus may have quietly had his niece Antonia Minor pressure her son Claudius to refrain from writing a history on Rome's civil wars.

=== Middle Ages and Renaissance ===
Augustus became revered in medieval Christendom due to church fathers Orosius, Ambrose, and Bede depicting him as a divinely ordained peacemaker who created a stable realm for the arrival of Christ. The c. 1250 Golden Legend hagiographical anthology promoted the legend of the Tiburtine Sibyl, in which Augustus had an alleged vision of Jesus and his mother Mary. Petrarch viewed Augustus as a righteous ruler, an idea widely accepted in Renaissance humanist literature until the 16th century when more negative views found acceptance. (Note: Florentine authors began to develop negative views about Augustus during the Italian Renaissance, while the 1515 publication of Tacitus's Annals by Filippo Beroaldo advanced views that Augustus was a hypocritical and calculating destroyer of the Republic.)

=== Modern perspectives ===
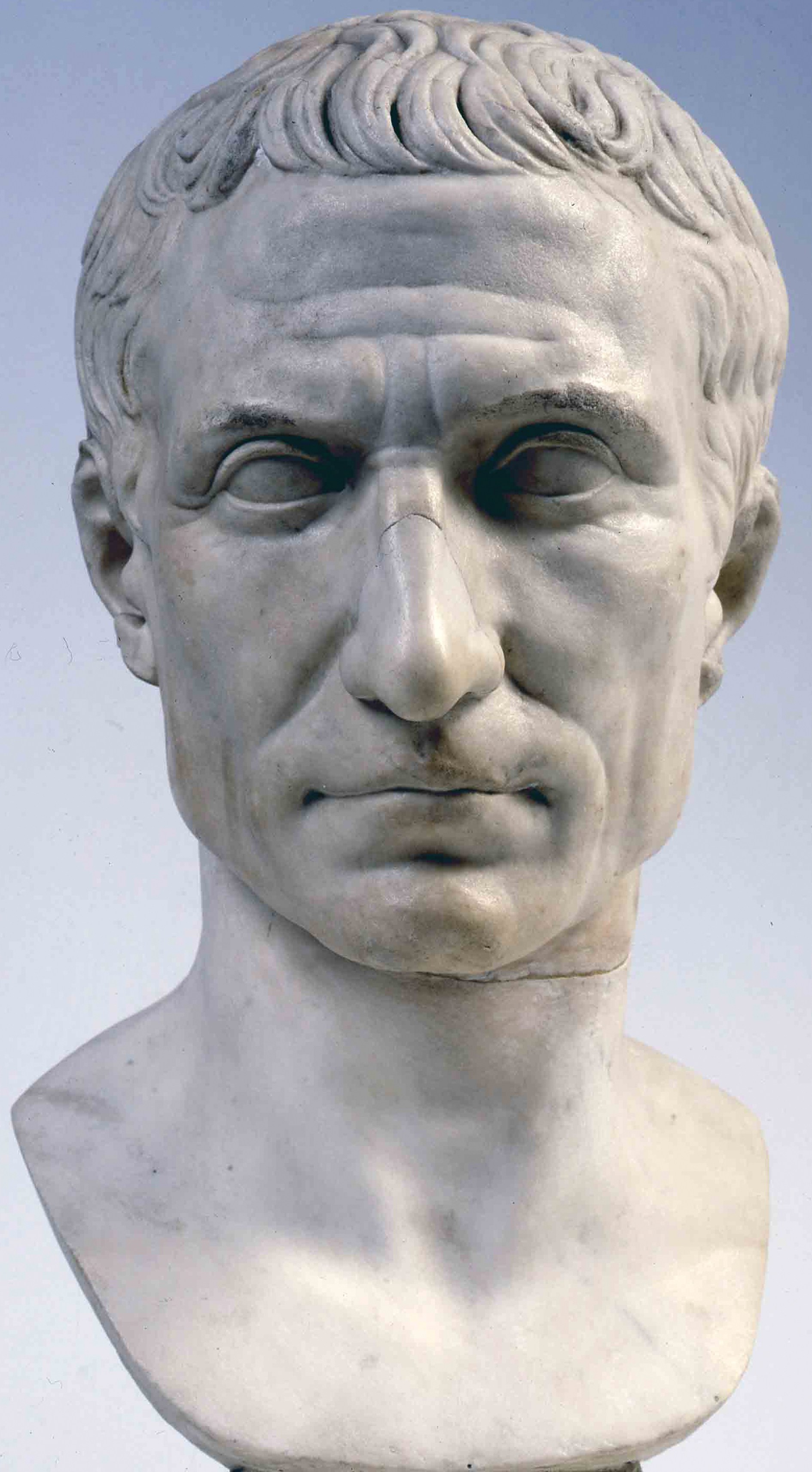
The Chiaramonti Caesar bust, a posthumous portrait of Julius Caesar in marble, 44–30 BC, Museo Pio-Clementino, Vatican Museums

Views on Augustus varied during the early modern period. The Anglo-Irish writer Jonathan Swift criticized Augustus for installing tyranny over Rome, likening the virtues of the previous Roman Republic to those of Great Britain's constitutional monarchy. French political philosopher Montesquieu remarked that Augustus was a coward in battle, and English playwright William Shakespeare portrayed 'Caesar' as such in his 1607 play Antony & Cleopatra. Scottish scholar Thomas Blackwell deemed Augustus a bloodthirsty usurper and tyrant, views shared by Montesquieu and Voltaire. During the 19th century Augustus was widely considered a reformer who brought peace and prosperity after turmoil in the Republic, though Napoleon Bonaparte emulated Julius Caesar as a role model and was slightly dismissive of Augustus.

Views of Augustus shifted again during the 20th century, as scholarship during the upheavals of fascism in the 1930s and 1940s generally viewed Augustus's seizure of power negatively. In 1937–1938, Benito Mussolini held an 'Augustan exhibition' in Rome to celebrate the bimillenary of the birth of Augustus, an event which influenced architectural trends of Fascist Italy. Mussolini also styled himself as Il Duce after dux Augustus. Expressing apprehension about this, historian Ronald Syme sparked debate by publishing the then controversial The Roman Revolution (1939) at the onset of the Second World War, acknowledging the political climate that impacted his research. He rejected fascist appropriations of ancient Rome while examining deceptive political terminology employed by totalitarian regimes. Later scholarship emphasized a greater focus on the art and literature produced in the Augustan age. In 2014 the historian Adrian Goldsworthy stressed that, in modern terms, Augustus was essentially a military dictator, but argued that Augustus was no more ruthless than "other warlords", and that comparing him to Mussolini or other modern dictators is anachronistic and inaccurate.

The Roman Revolution was not widely circulated in continental Europe until 1952, but this and other works by Syme left a major impact on scholarship in the English-speaking world and its views on Augustus in particular. Syme viewed Octavian as a "sickly and sinister youth," and his political faction as an entity similar to a modern crime syndicate. Syme criticized some academics for attributing Julius Caesar's political achievements to Octavian, their ready acceptance of Augustan propaganda about Mark Antony, and the view of Augustus as a flawless organizer and peacemaker. Goldsworthy largely agrees with Syme's analysis, but argues that he was very favorable toward Antony and far too harsh in criticizing Augustus's supporters, "especially the majority who came from outside the established aristocracy". Modern academics debate whether Augustus attempted to distance himself from Caesar the dictator when embracing the deified Caesar. Octavian–Augustus placed more emphasis on his own role as princeps over time.

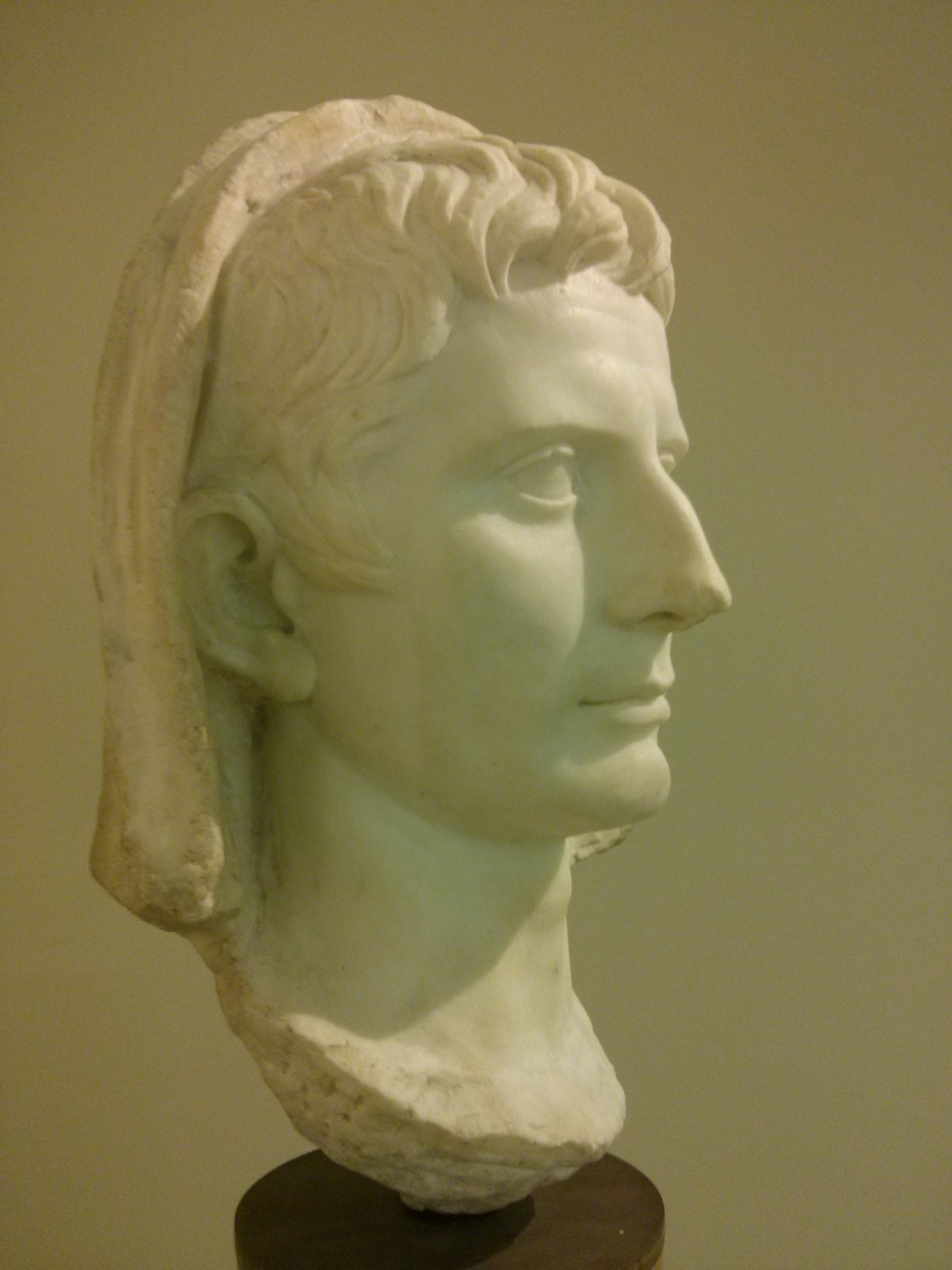
Veiled head of Augustus, 1st century BC, National Archaeological Museum of the Marches

Modern historians have also highlighted the positive effects of Augustus's lengthy reign, which helped transform Rome into a de facto monarchy. Eck and Takács credit him with establishing a standing professional army, introducing dynastic succession, beautifying the capital at the emperor's expense, and ensuring relative peace and prosperity for over two centuries. Historian Walter Eder contends that Augustus promoted Republican Roman virtues and addressed the concerns of the plebs by means of generosity and cutting back on lavish excess. In 29 BC, Augustus gave 400 sesterces (equal to one-tenth of a Roman pound of gold) each to 250,000 citizens, 1,000 sesterces each to 120,000 veterans in the colonies, and spent 700 million sesterces in purchasing land for his soldiers to settle upon. He also restored 82 different temples to display his care for the Roman pantheon of deities. In 28 BC, he melted down 80 silver statues commemorating him in an attempt to appear frugal and modest.

== Cultural depictions ==
=== Physical appearance and official images ===
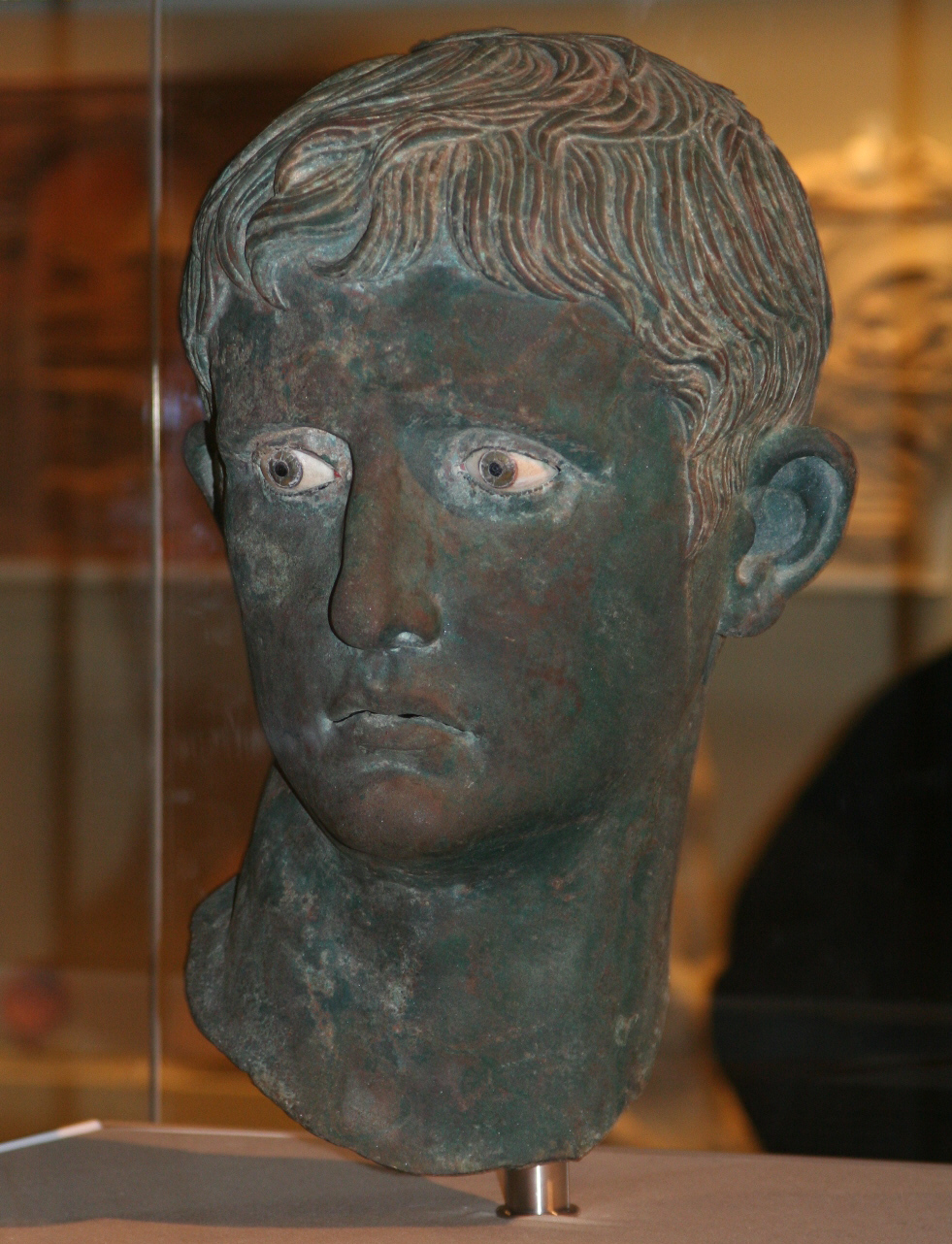
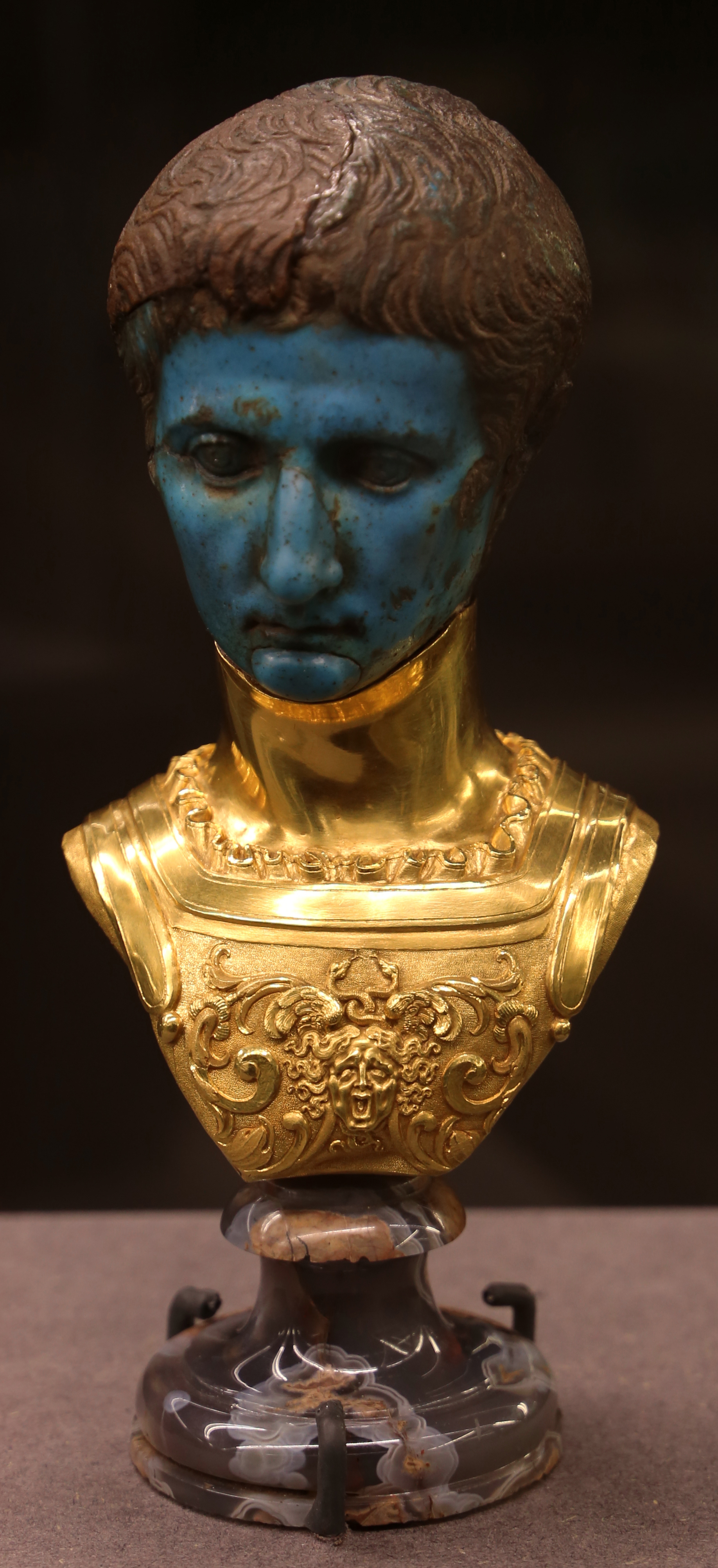
Left: The bronze Meroë Head of Augustus, excavated from a Nubian temple in Meroë in the Kingdom of Kush (modern Sudan), taken as a trophy of war during the invasion of Roman Egypt by Queen Amanirenas, dated 27–25 BC
Right: Faience head of Augustus, early 1st-century AD, Museo degli Argenti, Florence

Suetonius's Twelve Caesars includes a biography and physical description of Augustus. (Note: Suetonius, Augustus, 79, described Augustus as "unusually handsome and exceedingly graceful at all periods of his life, though he cared nothing for personal adornment. He was so far from being particular about the dressing of his hair, that he would have several barbers working in a hurry at the same time, and as for his beard he now had it clipped and now shaved, while at the very same time he would either be reading or writing something ... He had clear, bright eyes ... His teeth were wide apart, small, and ill-kept; his hair was slightly curly and inclined to golden; his eyebrows met. His ears were of moderate size, and his nose projected a little at the top and then bent ever so slightly inward. His complexion was between dark and fair. He was short of stature, although Julius Marathus, his freedman and keeper of his records, says that he was five feet and nine inches [in modern units, just under 1.7 m or 5 ft 7 in], but this was concealed by the fine proportion and symmetry of his figure, and was noticeable only by comparison with some taller person standing beside him".) Descriptions of hair color in ancient Roman sources are often ambiguous, and Suetonius's comment that Augustus's curly hair was inclined towards golden (subflavum) could mean either "slightly blond" or "brown rather than black" hair. Scientific analysis of traces of paint found in his official statues shows that he most likely had naturally light brown hair. Augustus was likely about 5 feet 9 inches (1.75 m) tall and may have worn built-up soles to appear taller. The best-known portraits of Augustus include the Prima Porta Statue, his sculpted relief on the Ara Pacis, and the sculpted Via Labicana Augustus. Prominent cameo portraits include the Blacas Cameo and Gemma Augustea. The official imagery was tightly controlled and idealized, drawing from a tradition of Hellenistic portraiture. From c. 29 BC, his portraits proliferated across the Roman world, and they emphasized a youthful appearance until his death.

Julius Caesar first introduced personalized portraits of living individuals on Roman coins in the 40s BC, and Augustus's image on coins is perhaps one means by which he emulated Caesar. Augustus likely personally dictated how these portraits appeared. Augustus's name and image became universal on coinage throughout the Empire. Historian Adrian Goldsworthy notes how the 'Caesar' on silver coins which was mentioned by Jesus in the New Testament was most likely Augustus rather than Tiberius. Later emperors minted coins depicting both themselves and previous rulers including Augustus.

=== Post-classical visual artworks ===
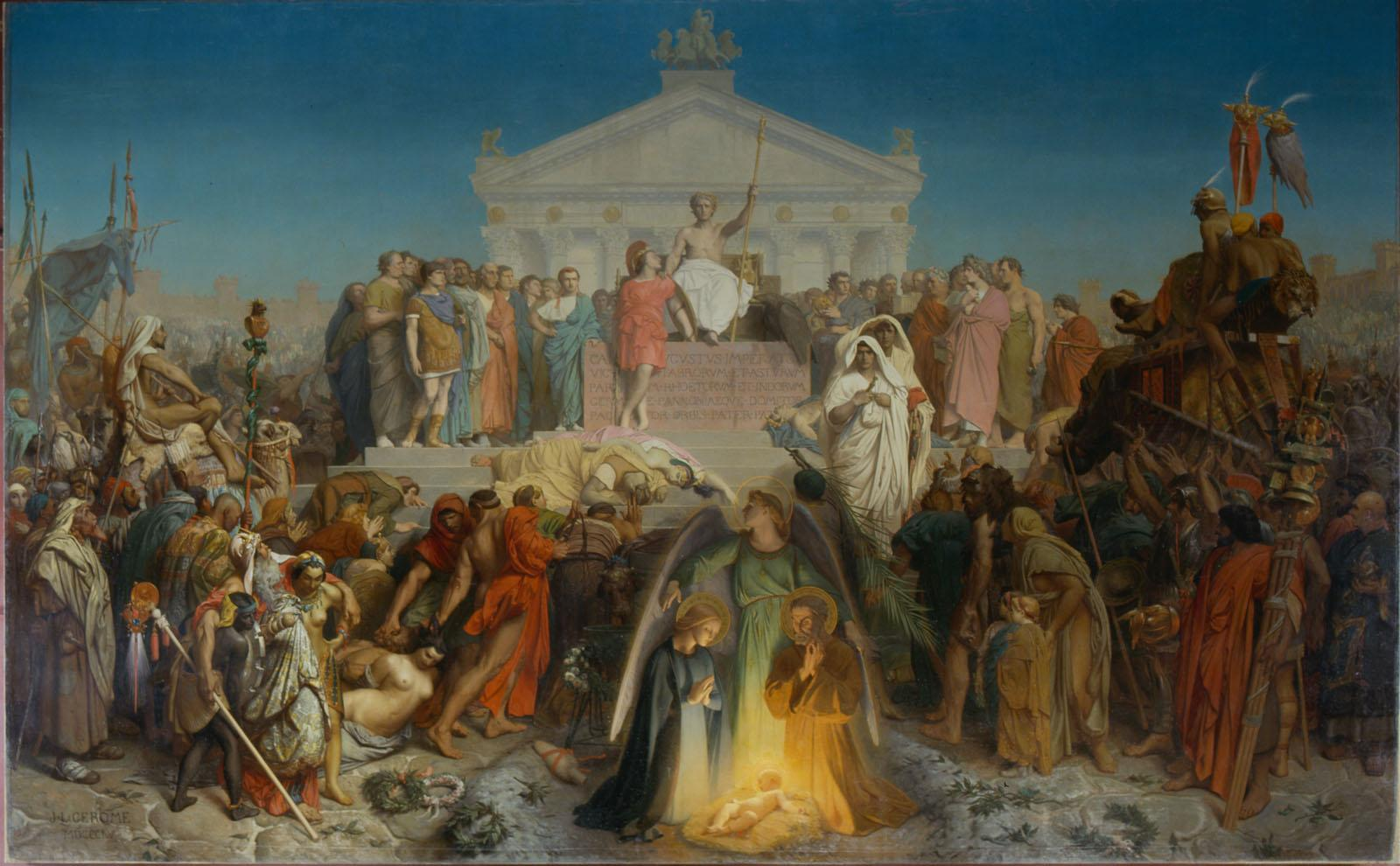
The Age of Augustus, the Birth of Christ, c. 1852–1854, by Jean-Léon Gérôme, Musée de Picardie

Various artworks after classical antiquity have also depicted Augustus. For instance, he appears on the Hereford Mappa Mundi dated c. 1300 wearing a papal tiara as he orders geographers to create a survey of the world. In 1765 Louis XV commissioned French painter Charles-André van Loo to create a painting depicting Augustus closing the gates of the Temple of Janus in the Forum, a signal that Rome was at peace. Louis XV disliked the painting and had it removed from his hunting lodge, but historian Mary Beard contends that van Loo's painting served as "an appropriate backdrop" during the signing of the 1802 Treaty of Amiens during the Napoleonic Wars. Napoleon III commissioned French painter Jean-Léon Gérôme to create the painting titled The Age of Augustus, the Birth of Christ (c. 1852–1854), which blends classical and gothic elements and depicts Augustus on an imperial dais above a nativity scene, juxtaposing the birth of Jesus with the peace brought about by the reign of Augustus. It was exhibited in Paris at the 1855 Universal Exposition.

=== Theater, film, televised series, and novels ===
Less famous than his great-uncle Julius Caesar, Augustus often appears as a minor character or brooding villain in theatrical plays, films, TV series, comics, and novels. Adrian Goldsworthy attributes this to William Shakespeare never writing a play centered around him. Shakespeare's 1599 play Julius Caesar features the character of Octavius, while in the 1607 play Antony and Cleopatra he plays a weak, cowardly, and manipulative foe to Antony under the name Caesar. This view may reflect ancient primary sources influenced by Octavian's propaganda war with Antony, manifested by Roddy McDowall's cold performance as Octavian in the 1963 film Cleopatra. Robert Graves's 1934 novel I, Claudius and its subsequent 1976 television series depict the older Augustus in a far more sympathetic light as he is outmaneuvered by his murderous wife Livia, though he plays only a supporting character.

== See also ==
- Augustan and Julio-Claudian art
- Augustan literature (ancient Rome)
- Gaius Maecenas
- Julio-Claudian family tree
- Julius Licinus
- Sebastos
- Temple of Augustus

== Sources ==
=== Ancient sources ===
- Appian. Bella civilia.
  - McGing, B. C. (2020). Appian: Roman History. Loeb Classical Library. Vol. IV–VI. Harvard University Press. ISBN 978-0-674-99647-2.
  - White, Horace (1913–14). Loeb Classical Library – via LacusCurtius.
- Augustus. Res Gestae Divi Augusti.
  - Cooley, Alison E. (2009). Res Gestae Divi Augusti: Text, Translation, and Commentary. Cambridge University Press. ISBN 978-0-521-84152-8.
  - Shipley, Frederick W. (1924). Loeb Classical Library – via LacusCurtius.
- Cicero. Epistulae ad Atticum.
  - Shackleton-Bailey, D. R. (1999). Loeb Classical Library Archived 14 December 2025 at the Wayback Machine. 4 volumes.
- Dio. Historia Romana.
  - Cary, Earnest (1914–27). Loeb Classical Library – via LacusCurtius Archived 4 April 2021 at the Wayback Machine.
- Florus. Epitomae.
- Livy. Periochae.
  - Lendering, Jona. (2003). Livius.org Archived 27 March 2022 at the Wayback Machine.
  - Schlesinger, Alfred C. (1959). Loeb Classical Library Archived 13 December 2025 at the Wayback Machine.
- Nicolaus Damascenus. Life of Augustus.
  - Toher, Mark (2017). Nicolaus of Damascus: the life of Augustus and the autobiography texts, translations and historical commentary. Cambridge University Press. ISBN 978-1-107-07561-0.
  - Hall, Clayton M. (1923). Northampton – via CSUN.edu. Archived 2007-07-14 at the Wayback Machine.
- Suetonius. Augustus.
  - Wardle, D. (2014). Life of Augustus: Vita divi Augusti. Oxford University Press. ISBN 978-0-19-968645-2.
  - Rolfe, J. C. (1913–14). Loeb Classical Library – via LacusCurtius
- Tacitus. Annales.
  - Woodman, A. J. (2004). The Annals. Indianapolis: Hackett. ISBN 978-0-87220-559-8.
  - Jackson, J. (1931–37). Loeb Classical Library – via LacusCurtius
- Velleius Paterculus. Historia Romana.
  - Woodman, A. J. (2025). Velleius Paterculus. Loeb Classical Library. Harvard University Press. Archived from the original on 11 December 2025.
  - Shipley, Frederick W. (1924). Loeb Classical Library – via LacusCurtius Archived 22 February 2024 at the Wayback Machine.

=== Modern sources ===
- Alston, Richard (2015). Rome's Revolution: Death of the Republic and Birth of the Empire. Oxford University Press. ISBN 978-0-190-23160-6.
- Amici, Carla Maria (2015). "Unusual Examples of Sophisticated Iron Technology in the Heating Systems of Roman Imperial Baths". European Journal of Archaeology. 18 (4). Cambridge University Press: 658–678. doi:10.1179/1461957115Y.0000000002. Archived from the original on 2 January 2026.
- Ando, Clifford (2000). Imperial Ideology and Provincial Loyalty in the Roman Empire. Berkeley, Los Angeles and London: University of California Press. ISBN 978-0-520-28016-8.
- Arlington, Gabriel (2000) [1996]. The Hereford Mappa Mundi: a Medieval View of the World (reprint ed.). Leominster: Gracewing. ISBN 0-85244-355-2. Archived from the original on 13 January 2026.
- Beard, Mary (2021). Twelve Caesars: Images of Power from the Ancient World to the Modern. Princeton, New Jersey: Princeton University Press. ISBN 978-0-691-22236-3. Archived from the original on 1 January 2026.
- Bingham, Sandra (2021). "The House of Augustus: A Historical Detective Story by T P Wiseman (review)". Mouseion: Journal of the Classical Association of Canada. 62 (2): 317–319. ISSN 1913-5416. Archived from the original on 13 December 2025.
- Bivar, A. D. H. (1983). "The Political History of Iran Under the Arsacids". In Yarshater, Ehsan (ed.). The Cambridge History of Iran. Vol. 3. London, New York, New Rochelle, Melbourne, and Sydney: Cambridge University Press. pp. 21–99. ISBN 978-0-521-20092-9.
- Blackburn, Bonnie; Holford-Strevens, Leofranc (2003) [1999]. The Oxford Companion to the Year (Reprinted with corrections ed.). Oxford and New York: Oxford University Press. ISBN 978-0-19-214231-3.
- Bourne, Ella (1918). "Augustus as a Letter-Writer". Transactions and Proceedings of the American Philological Association. 49: 53–66. doi:10.2307/282994. JSTOR 282994.
- Bowersock, G. W. (1983). Roman Arabia. Cambridge: Harvard University Press. ISBN 0-674-77755-7.
- Bowersock, G. W. (1990). "The Pontificate of Augustus". In Raaflaub, Kurt A.; Toher, Mark (eds.). Between Republic and Empire: Interpretations of Augustus and his Principate. Berkeley: University of California Press. pp. 380–394. ISBN 978-0-520-08447-6.
- Bringmann, Klaus (2007) [2002]. A History of the Roman Republic. Translated by Smyth, W. J. Cambridge: Polity. ISBN 978-0-7456-3371-8. Archived from the original on 12 June 2018.
- British Museum (29 December 2017). "What's in a name? Months of the year". British Museum. Archived from the original on 11 January 2026.
- Brizzi, Giovanni (2022). "D'un anniversaire à l'autre: Auguste et la notion de pax entre Fascisme et époque moderne". In Cavalieri, Marco; Assenmaker, Pierre; Cavagna, Mattia; Engels, David (eds.). Augustus through the Ages: Receptions, Readings and Appropriations of the Historical Figure of the First Roman Emperor. Collection Latomus (in French). Vol. 366. Brussels: Peeters Publishers. pp. 35–50. doi:10.2307/jj.10574832.4. ISBN 978-90-429-4962-1.
- Brockkötter, Philipp (2025). Die imitatio Augusti in der frühen Kaiserzeit [The imitatio Augusti in the Early Imperial Age]. Göttingen: Verlag Antike. ISBN 978-3-911065-15-3.
- Broughton, Thomas Robert Shannon (1952). The magistrates of the Roman republic. Vol. 2. New York: American Philological Association.
- Brosius, Maria (2006). The Persians: An Introduction. London & New York: Routledge. ISBN 978-0-415-32089-4.
- Bunson, Matthew (1994). Encyclopedia of the Roman Empire. New York: Facts on File. ISBN 978-0-8160-3182-5.
- Burgess, Richard W. (2014). Roman Imperial Chronology and Early-Fourth-Century Historiography. Historia Einzelschriften. Stuttgart: Steiner. ISBN 978-3-515-10732-7. Archived from the original on 14 June 2024.
- Burstein, Stanley M. (2004). The Reign of Cleopatra. Westport, Connecticut: Greenwood Press. ISBN 978-0-313-32527-4.
- Burton, Graham (2012). "tributum". Oxford Classical Dictionary. doi:10.1093/acrefore/9780199381135.013.6557.
- Carter, John M. (1983). "Augustus down the centuries". History Today. 33 (3): 24–30. ISSN 0018-2753.
- Cavalieri, Marco; Assenmaker, Pierre; Cavagna, Mattia; Engels, David (2022). "Augustus through the Ages: Introduction". In Cavalieri, Marco; Assenmaker, Pierre; Cavagna, Mattia; Engels, David (eds.). Augustus through the Ages: Receptions, Readings and Appropriations of the Historical Figure of the First Roman Emperor. Collection Latomus. Vol. 366. Brussels: Peeters Publishers. pp. 3–32. doi:10.2307/jj.10574832.4. ISBN 978-90-429-4962-1.
- Chisholm, Kitty; Ferguson, John (1981). Rome: The Augustan Age; A Source Book. Oxford: Oxford University Press, in association with the Open University Press. ISBN 978-0-19-872108-6.
- Claes, Liesbeth (2022). "Augustan Images of Legitimacy: The Numismatic Memory of Augustus (AD 14-268)". In Cavalieri, Marco; Assenmaker, Pierre; Cavagna, Mattia; Engels, David (eds.). Augustus through the Ages: Receptions, Readings and Appropriations of the Historical Figure of the First Roman Emperor. Collection Latomus. Vol. 366. Brussels: Peeters Publishers. pp. 79–106. doi:10.2307/jj.10574832.4. ISBN 978-90-429-4962-1.
- Cotton, Hannah M.; Yakobson, Alexander (2002). "Arcanum Imperii: the Powers of Augustus". In Clar, Gillian; Rajak, Tessa (eds.). Philosophy and Power in the Graeco-Roman World: Essays in Honour of Miriam Griffin. Oxford: Oxford University Press. pp. 193–210. ISBN 0-19-8-29990-7.
- Davies, Mark (2010). Aspects of Roman History 82 BC–AD 14. London and New York: Routledge. doi:10.4324/978020385665. ISBN 978-0-203-85665-9.
- Dilke, O. A. W. (1987). "Maps in the Service of the State: Roman Cartography to the End of the Augustan Era". In Harley, J. B.; Woodward, David (eds.). The History of Cartography: Cartography in Prehistoric, Ancient, and Medieval Europe and the Mediterranean (PDF). Vol. 1. Chicago: Chicago University Press. ISBN 0-226-31633-5. Archived (PDF) from the original on 6 February 2026.
- Drogula, Fred K. (2015). Commanders & Command in the Roman Republic and Early Empire. Chapel Hill: University of North Carolina Press. ISBN 978-1-4696-2126-5.
- Eck, Werner; Takács, Sarolta A. (2003). The Age of Augustus. Translated by Schneider, Deborah Lucas (first ed.). Oxford: Blackwell Publishing. ISBN 0-631-22957-4.
- Eck, Werner; Takács, Sarolta A. (2007) [2003]. The Age of Augustus. Translated by Schneider, Deborah Lucas (second ed.). Oxford: Blackwell Publishing. ISBN 978-1-4051-5149-8. Archived from the original on 20 September 2022.
- Eder, Walter (2005). "Augustus and the Power of Tradition". In Galinsky, Karl (ed.). The Cambridge Companion to the Age of Augustus. Cambridge Companions to the Ancient World. Cambridge and New York: Cambridge University Press. pp. 13–32. ISBN 978-0-521-80796-8.
- Einaudi, Luca (February 2014). "Coins of the Month: The Struggle between Marc Antony and Octavian". Centre for History and Economics, Magdalene College, University of Cambridge. Archived from the original on 16 January 2026.
- Fishwick, Duncan (2004). The Imperial Cult in the Latin West III, Part 3. Leiden: Brill. p. 250. ISBN 978-90-474-1276-2.
- Fratantuono, Lee (2016). The Battle of Actium 31 BC: War for the World. Barnsley: Pen & Sword Military. ISBN 978-1-47384-714-9.
- Freisenbruch, Annelise (2017). Pierwsze damy antycznego Rzymu. Kobiety, które stały za plecami cesarzy [The First Ladies of Rome] (in Polish). Bellona. ISBN 978-83-11-14348-7.
- Galinsky, Karl (2005). "Introduction". In Galinsky, Karl (ed.). The Cambridge Companion to the Age of Augustus (PDF). Cambridge Companions to the Ancient World. Cambridge and New York: Cambridge University Press. pp. 1–10. ISBN 978-0-521-80796-8.
- Galinsky, Karl (2012). Augustus: Introduction to the Life of an Emperor. New York: Cambridge University Press. ISBN 978-0-521-74442-3.
- Golden, Gregory K (2013). Crisis management during the Roman Republic. Cambridge University Press. ISBN 978-1-107-05590-2. OCLC 842919750.
- Goldsworthy, Adrian (2014). Augustus: First Emperor of Rome. New Haven: Yale University Press. ISBN 978-0-300-17827-2.
- Green, Peter (1990). Alexander to Actium: The Historical Evolution of the Hellenistic Age. Hellenistic Culture and Society. Berkeley: University of California Press. ISBN 978-0-520-05611-4.
- Gruen, Erich S. (2005). "Augustus and the Making of the Principate". In Galinsky, Karl (ed.). Cambridge Companion to the Age of Augustus. Cambridge Companions to the Ancient World. Cambridge, MA; New York: Cambridge University Press. pp. 33–52. ISBN 978-0-521-80796-8.
- Hammond, Mason (1957). "Imperial Elements in the Formula of the Roman Emperors during the First Two and a Half Centuries of the Empire". Memoirs of the American Academy in Rome. 25: 17–64. JSTOR 4238646.
- Hammond, Mason (1965). "The Sincerity of Augustus". Harvard Studies in Classical Philology. 69: 139–162. ISSN 0073-0688. JSTOR 310780.
- Hinard, François (1985). Les proscriptions de la Rome républicaine (in French). Ecole française de Rome. ISBN 978-2-7283-0094-5.
- Holland, Richard (2005). Augustus, Godfather of Europe. Stroud, Gloucestershire: Sutton. ISBN 978-0-7509-2911-0.
- Hosch, William L. (2023). "August". Encyclopedia Britannica. Archived from the original on 18 March 2023.
- Hurley, Donna (2004). "Livia (Wife of Augustus)". De Imperatoribus Romanis. Archived from the original on 13 July 2025.
- Jones, Prudence J. (2006). Cleopatra: a sourcebook. Norman: University of Oklahoma Press. ISBN 978-0-8061-3741-4.
- Kelsall, Malcolm (1976). "Augustus and Pope". Huntington Library Quarterly. 39 (2): 117–131. JSTOR 3816937.
- Kokkinos, Nikos (1992). Antonia Augusta: Portrait of a Great Roman Lady. Psychology Press. ISBN 978-0-4150-8029-3.
- Kolb, Ann; Speidel, Michael (2017). "Imperial Rome and China: Communication and Information Transmission". In Elizalde, Maria Dolores; Wang, Jianlang (eds.). China's Development from a Global Perspective. Newcastle upon Tyne: Cambridge Scholars Publishing. pp. 28–56. ISBN 978-1-4438-1670-0.
- Levick, Barbara (2009). "Caesar's Political and Military Legacy to the Roman Emperors". In Griffin, Miriam (ed.). A Companion to Julius Caesar. Oxford: Blackwell. pp. 207–223. ISBN 978-1-4443-0845-7.
- Levick, Barbara (2010). Augustus: Image and Substance. London: Longman. ISBN 978-0-582-89421-1.
- Lewis, Anne-Marie (2023). "Nigidius Figulus and the Birth of a Future Dominus for the World: 63 B.C.". In Lewis, Anne-Marie (ed.). Celestial Inclinations: A Life of Augustus (online ed.). New York: Oxford University Press. pp. 19–35. doi:10.1093/oso/9780197599648.003.0002. ISBN 978-0-19-759967-9.
- Lindsay, Hugh (2009). Adoption in the Roman World. Cambridge University Press. ISBN 978-0-521-76050-8.
- Luc, Ireneusz (2024). Roman Military Tribunes (First Century BC to Third Century AD): A Historical and Prosopographical Study: Prosopographical Catalogue, Part 1: Roman Military Tribunes (tribuni Militum in Exercitu) and in the Garrison of the Roman Capital (tribuni Militum in Praetorio). Vol. 1. Oxford: Archaeopress Publishing. ISBN 978-1-80327-853-7.
- Luke, Trevor (2015). "Cultivating the memory of Octavius Thurinus". Journal of Ancient History. 3 (2): 242–266. doi:10.1515/jah-2015-0012. ISSN 2324-8106. S2CID 164329002.
- Mackay, Christopher S. (2004). Ancient Rome: A Military and Political History. Cambridge and New York: Cambridge University Press. ISBN 978-0-521-80918-4.
- Murray, Peter; Murray, Linda (2014). Devonshire Jones, Tom (ed.). The Oxford Dictionary of Christian Art & Architecture. Oxford: Oxford University Press. ISBN 978-0-19-969510-2.
- Nothaft, C. Philipp E. (2018). Scandalous Error: Calendar Reform and Calendrical Astronomy in Medieval Europe. Oxford University Press. doi:10.1093/oso/9780198799559.001.0001. ISBN 978-0-19-879955-9.
- Ohst, Henning (2023). Die 'Epistulae ad familiares' des Kaisers Augustus. Studien zur Textgeschichte in der Antike, Edition und Kommentar [The 'Epistulae ad familiares' of Emperor Augustus. A Study of its Textual History in Antiquity, Edition and Commentary] (in German). Berlin & Boston: De Gruyter. doi:10.1515/9783111193595. ISBN 978-3-11-119151-5.
- Panzanelli, Roberta (2008). The Color of Life: Polychromy in Sculpture from Antiquity to the Present. Los Angeles: Getty Publications. ISBN 978-0-89236-917-1.
- Raaflaub, Kurt A.; Samons, Loren J. II (1993). "Opposition to Augustus". In Raaflaub, Kurt A.; Toher, Mark (eds.). Between Republic and Empire: Interpretations of Augustus and His Principate. Berkeley; Los Angeles: University of California Press. ISBN 978-0-520-08447-6.
- Rawson, Elizabeth (1994). "The Aftermath of the Ides". In Crook, John; et al. (eds.). The Last Age of the Roman Republic, 146–43 BC. Cambridge Ancient History. Vol. 9 (2nd ed.). Cambridge and New York: Cambridge University Press. pp. 468–490. ISBN 0-521-85073-8. OCLC 121060.
- Richardson, John Stuart (2012). Augustan Rome, 44 BC to AD 14: the Restoration of the Republic and the Establishment of the Empire. The Edinburgh History of Ancient Rome. Edinburgh University Press. ISBN 978-0-7486-1955-9.
- Richardson, L (1992). A New Topographical Dictionary of Ancient Rome. Johns Hopkins University Press. ISBN 978-0-8018-4300-6.
- Ring, Trudy; Salkin, Robert M.; La Boda, Sharon La (1996). International Dictionary of Historic Places: Southern Europe. London and New York: Taylor & Francis. ISBN 978-1-884964-02-2.
- Roberts, John (2007). "Princeps senatus". Oxford Dictionary of the Classical World. Oxford Reference. p. 858. doi:10.1093/acref/9780192801463.001.0001. ISBN 978-0-19-280146-3.
- Roller, Duane W. (2010). Cleopatra: a biography. Oxford and New York: Oxford University Press. ISBN 978-0-19-536553-5.
- Rowell, Henry Thompson (1962). Rome in the Augustan Age. The Centers of Civilization Series. Vol. 5. Norman, Oklahoma: University of Oklahoma Press. ISBN 0-8061-0956-4.
- Santangelo, Federico; Vitello, Eugenia (2025). "The Politics of Syme's Revolution". Revista de Historiografía (40): 31–56. doi:10.20318/revhisto.2025.9716. ISSN 1885-2718.
- Scullard, H. H. (1982) [1959]. From the Gracchi to Nero: A History of Rome from 133 B.C. to A.D. 68 (5th ed.). London; New York: Routledge. ISBN 978-0-415-02527-0.
- Scott, Kenneth (1933). "The Political Propaganda of 44–30 B.C.". Memoirs of the American Academy in Rome. 11: 7–49. JSTOR 4238573.
- Sear, David (31 December 2004). Roman Coins and Their Values: 4th Edition. London: Spink Books. ISBN 978-1-912667-41-3.
- Setton, Kenneth M. (1976). The Papacy and the Levant (1204–1571), Volume I: The Thirteenth and Fourteenth Centuries. Philadelphia: The American Philosophical Society. ISBN 978-0-87169-114-9.
- Shaw-Smith, R. (1971). "A Letter from Augustus to Tiberius". Greece and Rome. 18 (2): 213–214. doi:10.1017/S0017383500018118. S2CID 161104443.
- Shelton, Jo-Ann (1998). As the Romans Did: A Sourcebook in Roman Social History (2nd ed.). Oxford and New York: Oxford University Press. ISBN 978-0-19-508974-5.
- Shotter, David (2005) [1991]. Augustus Caesar (2nd ed.). London and New York: Routledge. ISBN 0-415-31935-8.
- Smith, R. R. R. (1997). "The Public Image of Licinius I: Portrait Sculpture and Imperial Ideology in the Early Fourth Century". Journal of Roman Studies. 87: 170–202. doi:10.2307/301374. JSTOR 301374. S2CID 162898808.
- Southern, Pat (1998). Augustus. Roman Imperial Biographies (first ed.). London and New York: Routledge. ISBN 978-0-415-16631-7.
- Southern, Pat (2014) [1998]. Augustus. Roman Imperial Biographies (second ed.). London and New York: Routledge. ISBN 978-0-415-62838-9.
- Starr, Chester G. (1952). "The Perfect Democracy of the Roman Empire". The American Historical Review. 58 (1): 1–16. JSTOR 1844784.
- Stern, Gaius (2006). Women, children, and Senators on the Ara Pacis Augustae: A Study of Augustus's Vision of a New World Order in 13 BC. Berkeley, California: University of California Press. Archived from the original on 19 July 2025.
- Strothmann, Meret (Bochum) (1 October 2006). "Augustus [2]". New Pauly. Brill. doi:10.1163/1574-9347_bnp_e12220040. ISSN 1574-9347. Archived from the original on 15 March 2023.
- Swan, Peter Michael (2004). The Augustan Succession. Oxford and New York: Oxford University Press. ISBN 978-0-19-516774-0.
- Syme, Ronald (1986). The Augustan Aristocracy. Oxford: Oxford University Press. ISBN 978-0-1981-4859-3.
- Syme, Ronald (2002) [1st pub. 1939]. The Roman Revolution. Oxford: Oxford University Press. ISBN 978-0-19-280320-7.
- Syme, Ronald (1958). "Imperator Caesar: A Study in Nomenclature". Historia. 7 (2): 175–188. JSTOR 4434568.
- Syme, Ronald (1988). "Clues to testamentary adoption". Roman Papers. Vol. 4. Amsterdam: Gieben. pp. 159–73.
- Tatum, W. Jeffrey (2024). A Noble Ruin: Mark Antony, Civil War, and the Collapse of the Roman Republic. Oxford University Press. ISBN 978-0-19-769490-9.
- Vervaet, Fredrick (2020). "The triumvirate rei publicae constituendae". In Pina Polo, Francisco (ed.). The triumviral period: civil war, political crisis and socioeconomic transformations. Prensas de la Universidad de Zaragoza. ISBN 978-84-1340-096-9.
- Walker, Susan (2008). "Cleopatra in Pompeii?". Papers of the British School at Rome. 76: 35–46. doi:10.1017/S0068246200000404. S2CID 62829223.
- Walker, Susan; Burnett, Andrew (1981). The Image of Augustus. London: British Museum Publications. ISBN 978-0-7141-1270-1.
- Welch, Kathryn (2002). "Sextus Pompeius and the Res Publica in 42–39". In Powell, Anton; Welch, Kathryn (eds.). Sextus Pompeius. London: Classical Press of Wales. pp. 31–64. ISBN 0-7156-3127-6.
- Welch, Kathryn (2014). "The lex Pedia of 43 BCE and its aftermath". Hermathena (196/197): 137–162. ISSN 0018-0750. JSTOR 26740133.
- Wells, Colin Michael (1995). The Roman Empire. Cambridge, Massachusetts: Harvard University Press. ISBN 978-0-674-77770-5.
- Welsby, Derek (1996). The Kingdom of Kush: the Napatan and Meroitic Empires. London: British Museum Press. ISBN 978-0-7141-0986-2. OCLC 34888835.
- Westphal, Heiko (2025). "The Julio-Claudian principate: tradition and transition, edited by Christina T. Kuhn (review)". Bryn Mawr Classical Review. 2025.12.21. Archived from the original on 15 January 2026.
- Wiseman, T. Peter (2022). "Palace-sanctuary or pavilion? Augustus' house and the limits of archaeology". Papers of the British School at Rome. 90: 9–34. doi:10.1017/S0068246221000295. ISSN 0068-2462.
- Zerbey IV, Joseph H. (2016). "The Life and Times of the Other Caesar". Torch. 89 (3): 25–28. ISSN 0040-9448.

Augustus Julio-Claudian dynasty Born: 23 September 63 BC Died: 19 August AD 14
Regnal titles
New title	Roman emperor 27 BC – AD 14	Succeeded by Tiberius
Political offices
Preceded by C. Vibius Pansa Caetronianus; A. Hirtius	Roman consul 43 BC (suffect); With: Q. Pedius	Succeeded by M. Aemilius Lepidus; L. Munatius Plancus
Preceded by Paullus Aemilius Lepidus; M. Herennius Picens	Roman consul II; 33 BC; With: L. Volcatius Tullus	Succeeded by Cn. Domitius Ahenobarbus; C. Sosius
Preceded by Cn. Domitius Ahenobarbus; C. Sosius	Roman consul III–XI; 31–23 BC; With: Mark Antony; M. Valerius Messalla Corvinus; M. Licinius Crassus; Sex. Appuleius; M. Agrippa; T. Statilius Taurus; M. Junius Silanus; C. Norbanus Flaccus; Cn. Calpurnius Piso	Succeeded by M. Claudius Marcellus Aeserninus; L. Arruntius
Preceded by D. Laelius Balbus; C. Antistius Vetus	Roman consul XII; 5 BC; With: L. Cornelius Sulla	Succeeded by C. Calvisius Sabinus; L. Passienus Rufus
Preceded by L. Cornelius Lentulus; M. Valerius Messalla Messallinus	Roman consul XIII; 2 BC; With: M. Plautius Silvanus	Succeeded by Cossus Cornelius Lentulus; L. Calpurnius Piso
Religious titles
Preceded by M. Aemilius Lepidus	Pontifex maximus 12 BC – AD 14	Succeeded by Tiberius
