= Cultural depictions of Augustus =

The Augustus of Prima Porta, one of the best-preserved examples of a standard type of official portrait

Caesar Augustus (63 BC – AD 14), known as "Octavian" before he became emperor, was the first and among the most important of the Roman Emperors. As such, he has frequently been depicted in literature and art since ancient times.

In many of these works, Augustus appears as the main character, but he also frequently features as a supporting character in depictions of prominent contemporaries, most notably in those of his adoptive father Julius Caesar and his great rivals Mark Antony and Cleopatra. As a result of the various titles he adopted throughout his life, Augustus is known to history by several different names, however he is most commonly referred to as either Octavian, Caesar or Augustus in popular culture, depending on the stage of his life that is being depicted.

Augustus' most visible impact on everyday culture is the eighth month of the year, which, having been previously known as Sextilis, was renamed in Augustus' honor in 8 BC because several of the most significant events in his rise to power, culminating in the fall of Alexandria, occurred during this month. Commonly repeated lore has it that August has thirty-one days because Augustus wanted his month to match the length of Julius Caesar's July, but this is an invention of the thirteenth-century scholar Johannes de Sacrobosco. Sextilis in fact had thirty-one days before it was renamed, and it was not chosen for its length.

== Roman sculpture ==
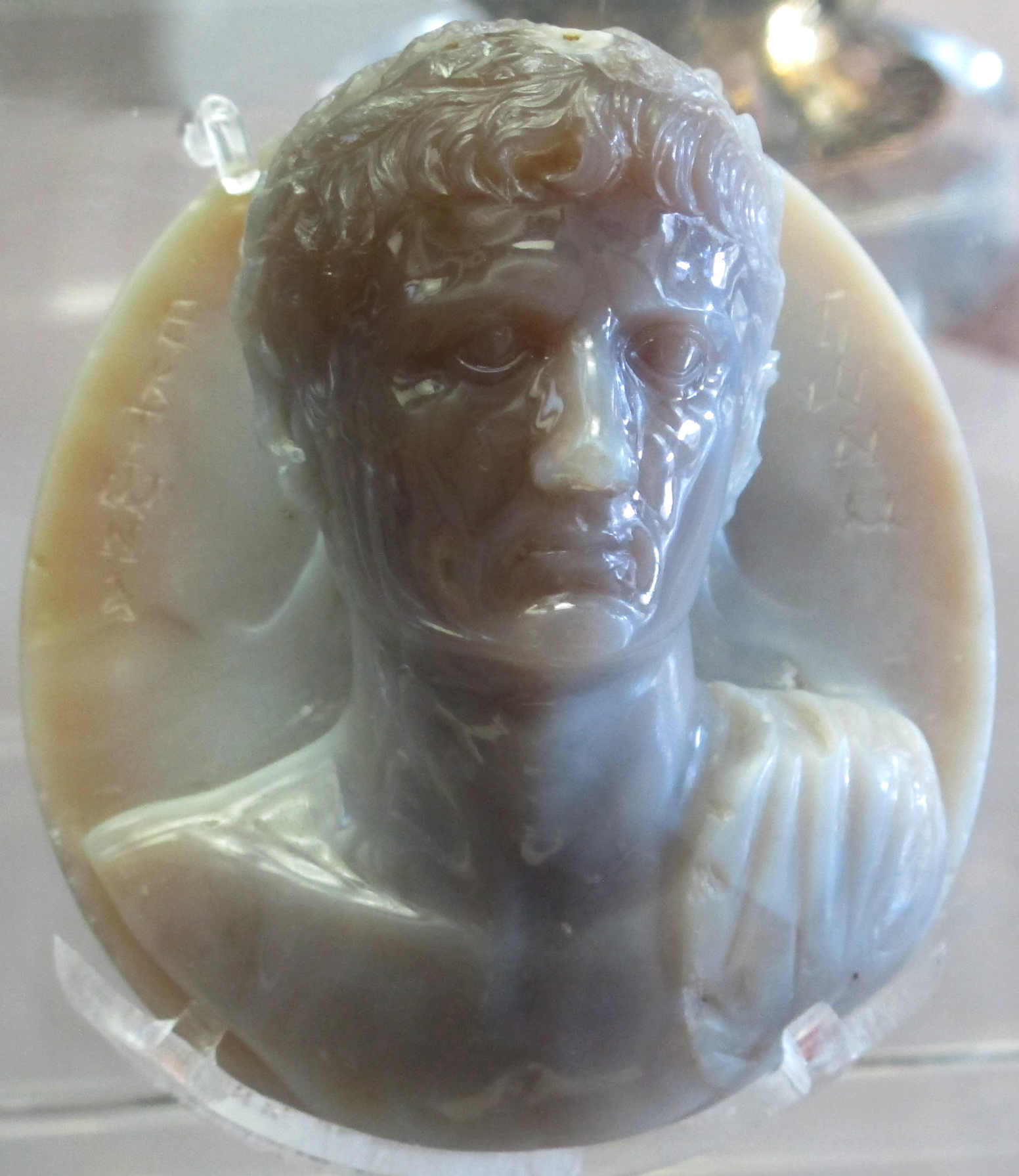
A Roman chalcedony engraved gem (intaglio) with a glyptic bust of Augustus, circa 10 BC

Augustus was one of the most widely depicted individuals in ancient times, appearing in coins, sculptures, cameos, plaques, and other media (no contemporary paintings of him survive, though many no doubt existed). Numerous arches and temples were dedicated to Augustus both during his lifetime and after his death, as the Roman imperial cult developed during his reign. His images were clearly controlled by the state, and consistently show a serene figure, who never shows signs of approaching old age, even in images dated to the last years before his death aged 75.

His dominant portrait, introduced in 27 BC to visually express the title Augustus, is that of the serene, ageless First Citizen, the most famous example of which is the Augustus of Prima Porta. At its best, in Roland R. R. Smith's view, this "type achieves a sort [of] visual paradox that might be described as mature, ageless, and authoritative youthfulness". Another full-size statue of Augustus with these "Primaporta type" features is the Augustus of Via Labicana, portraying Augustus in the role of Pontifex Maximus.

D. Boschung identified four other portrait types (the Actium or Alcúdia type, the Béziers-Spoleto type, the Forbes or MA 1280 type, and the Lucus Feroniae type), although Smith considers the Béziers-Spoleto type to be a variant of the Alcúdia type and the Lucus Feroniae type to be a category of dubious validity. The Alcúdia portrait type is thought to have been developed around 40 BC to coincide with the adoption of the patronymic title Divi Filius; Smith describes it as "a youthful portrait with thick hair and probably some expression of vigour and energy". Different scholars have argued whether the Forbes type, "with distinctive short forehead hair," preceded or followed the Prima Porta type.

=== Cameos ===
There is a small group of spectacular imperial engraved gems, cameos carved in contrasting colours of stone. These are sometimes called "State Cameos", that presumably originated, and were probably only seen, in the inner court circle of Augustus, as they show him with divine attributes that were still politically sensitive, and in some cases have sexual aspects that would not have been exposed to a wider audience.

These include the Gemma Augustea in Vienna (which also has the Gemma Claudia showing the Emperor Claudius and his brother with their wives), the Great Cameo of France in Paris, the Blacas Cameo in the British Museum, and the portrait now re-used in the Cross of Lothair. The existence of a "State workshop" producing these gems has been inferred, probably staffed by artists of Greek origin. Unlike larger sculpted portraits, these seem to have remained above ground since antiquity.

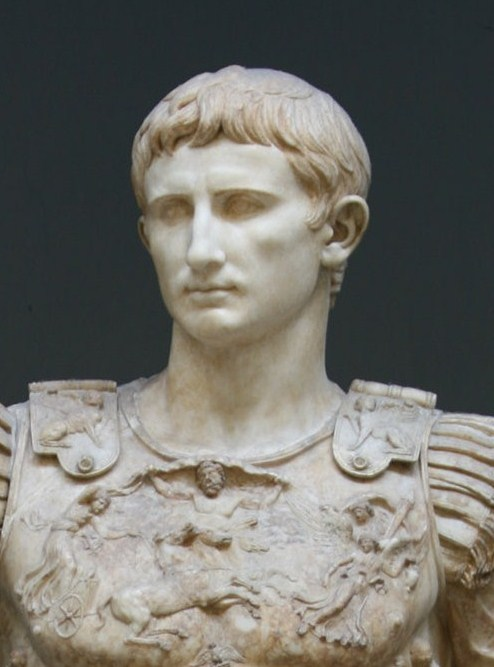
Augustus of Prima Porta

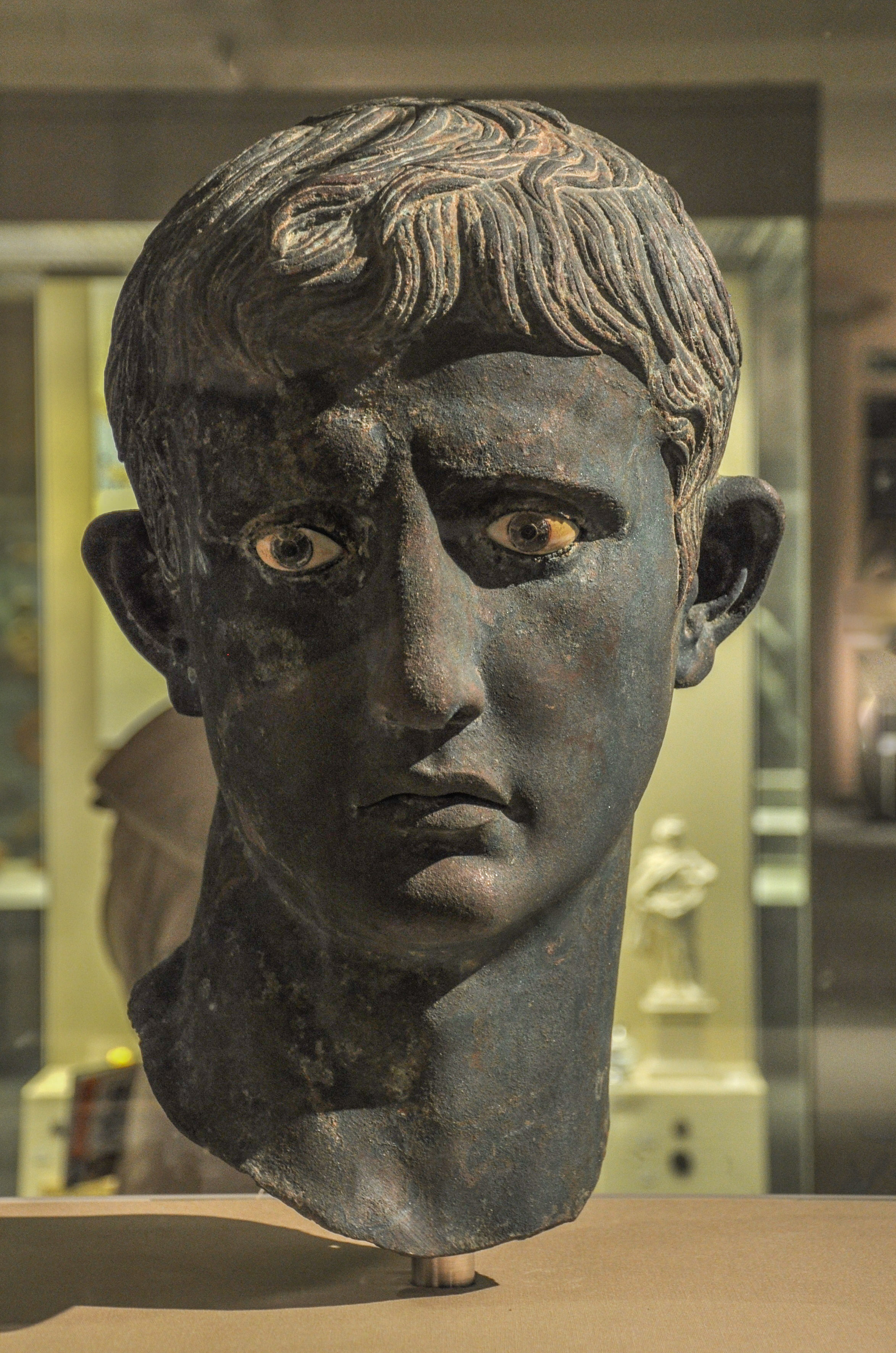
Meroë Head, dated to 30–25 BCE

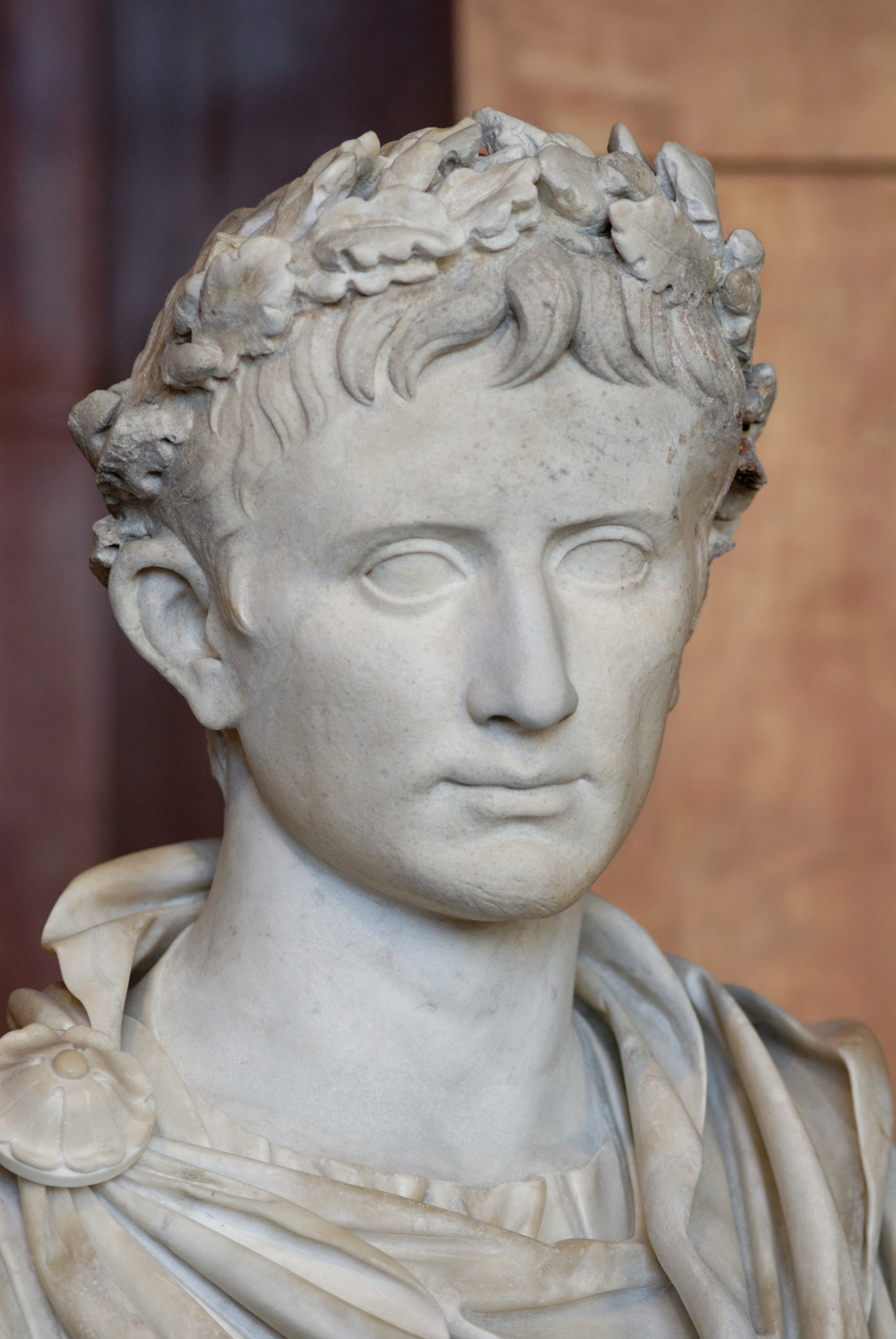
Portrait of the dominant ('Prima Porta') type

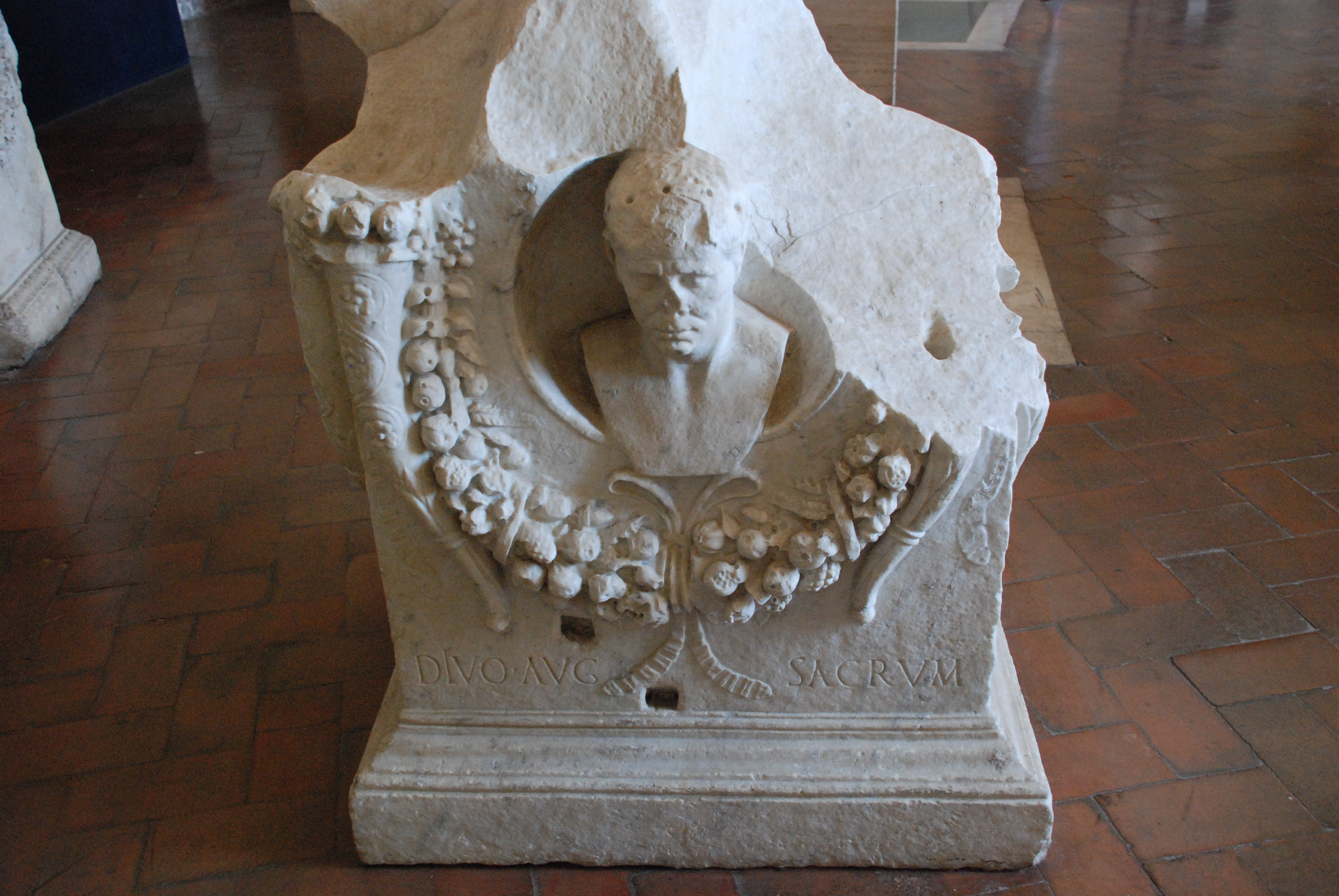
Augustus on the altar to Fortuna Primigenia at Praeneste, based on the 'Alcúdia' or 'Actium' type but showing greater age

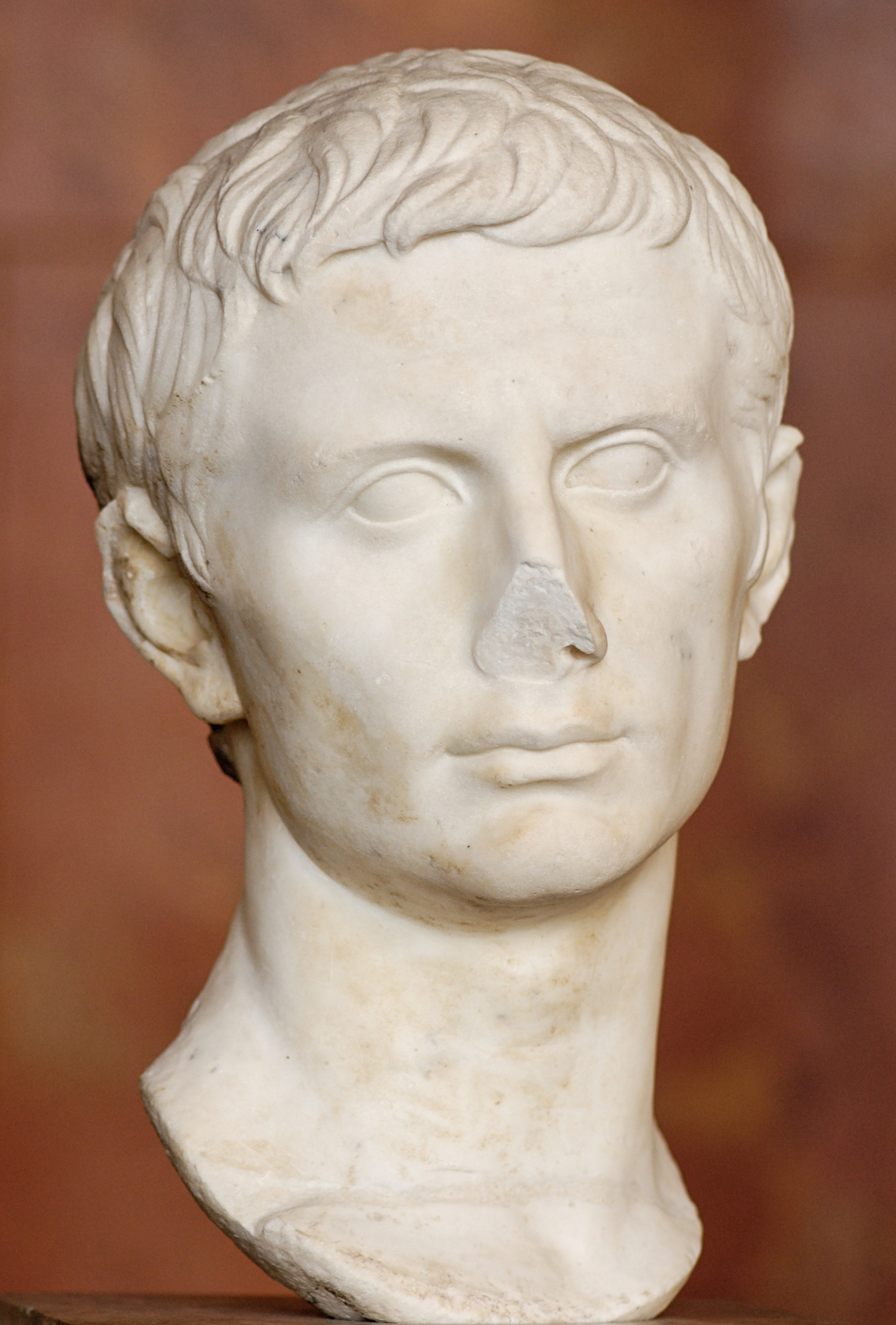
Portrait of the 'Forbes' type (Louvre MA 1280)

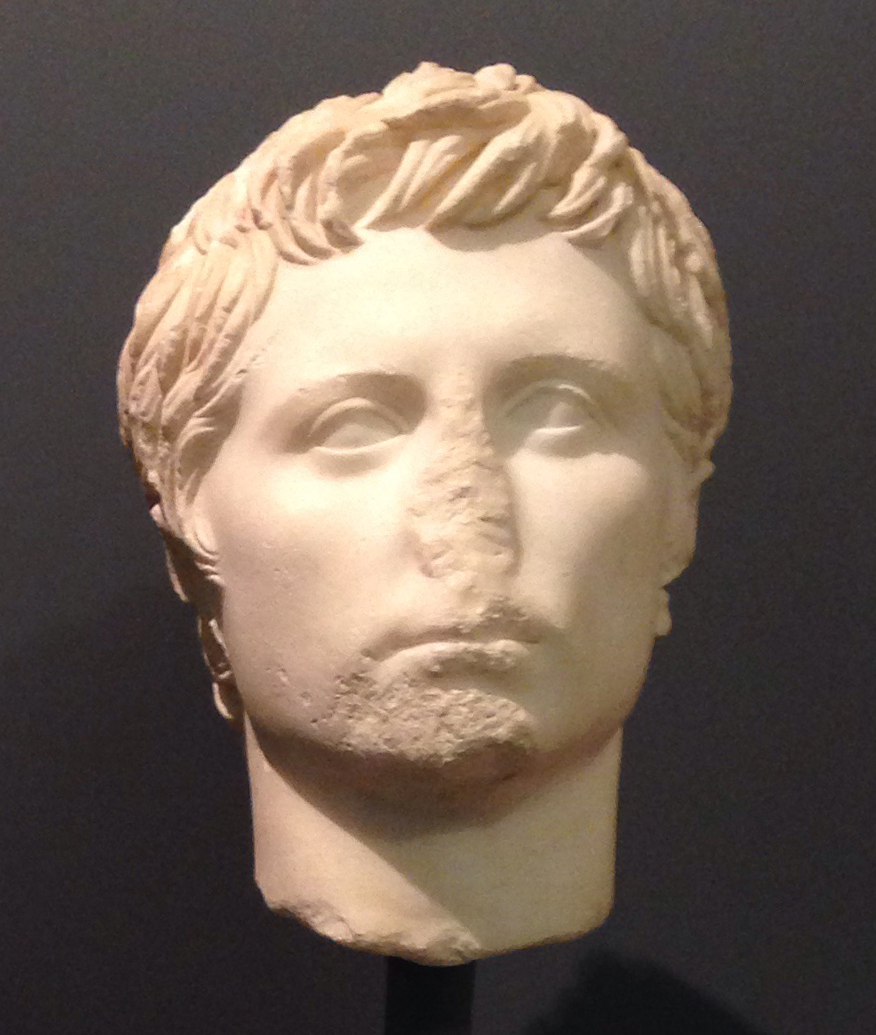
Bust of Augustus in Spoleto, one of the two examples of the 'Béziers-Spoleto' portrait type

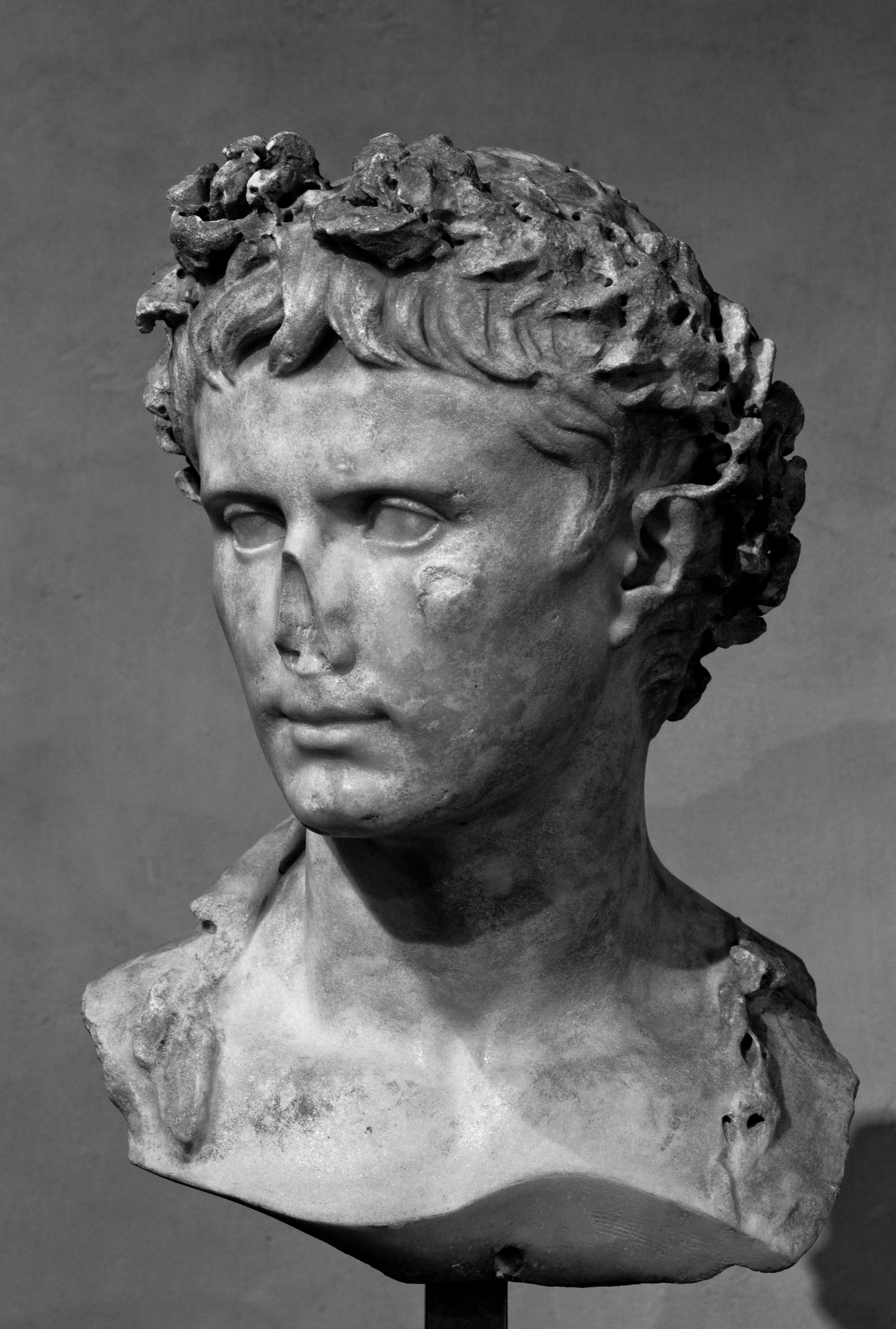
Augustus in the Villa Chiragan. This portrait is based on the Alcúdia and Prima Porta types but shows greater age

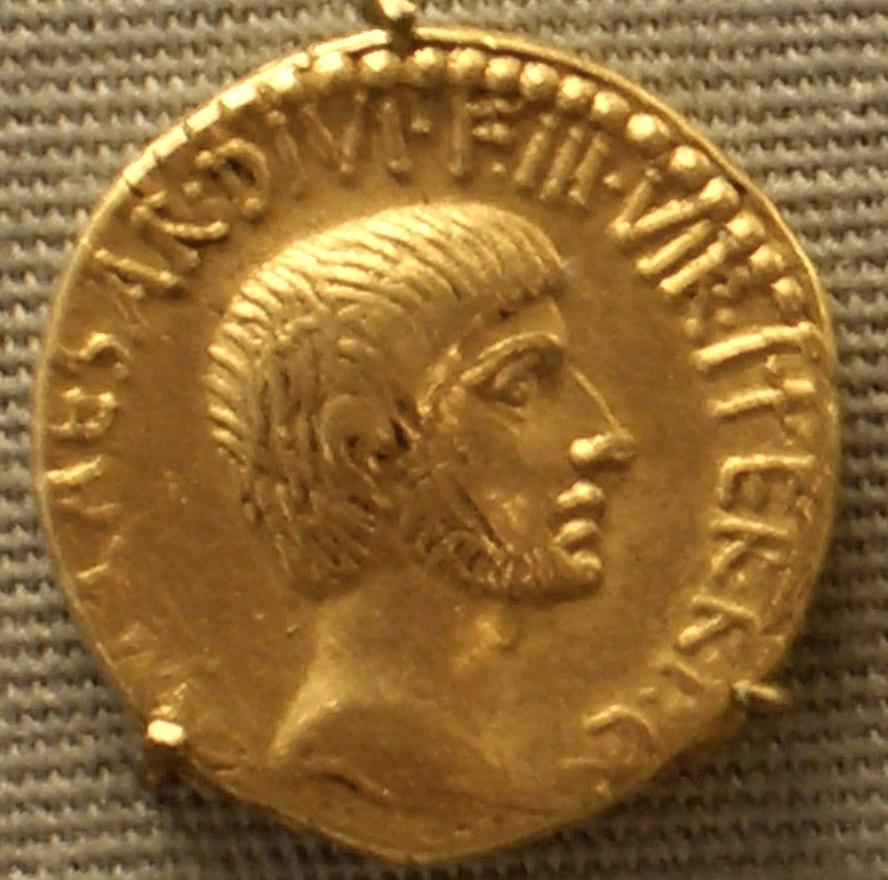
Augustus, then named Caesar Divi Filius, in 36 BCE; his beard symbolizes that he is in mourning

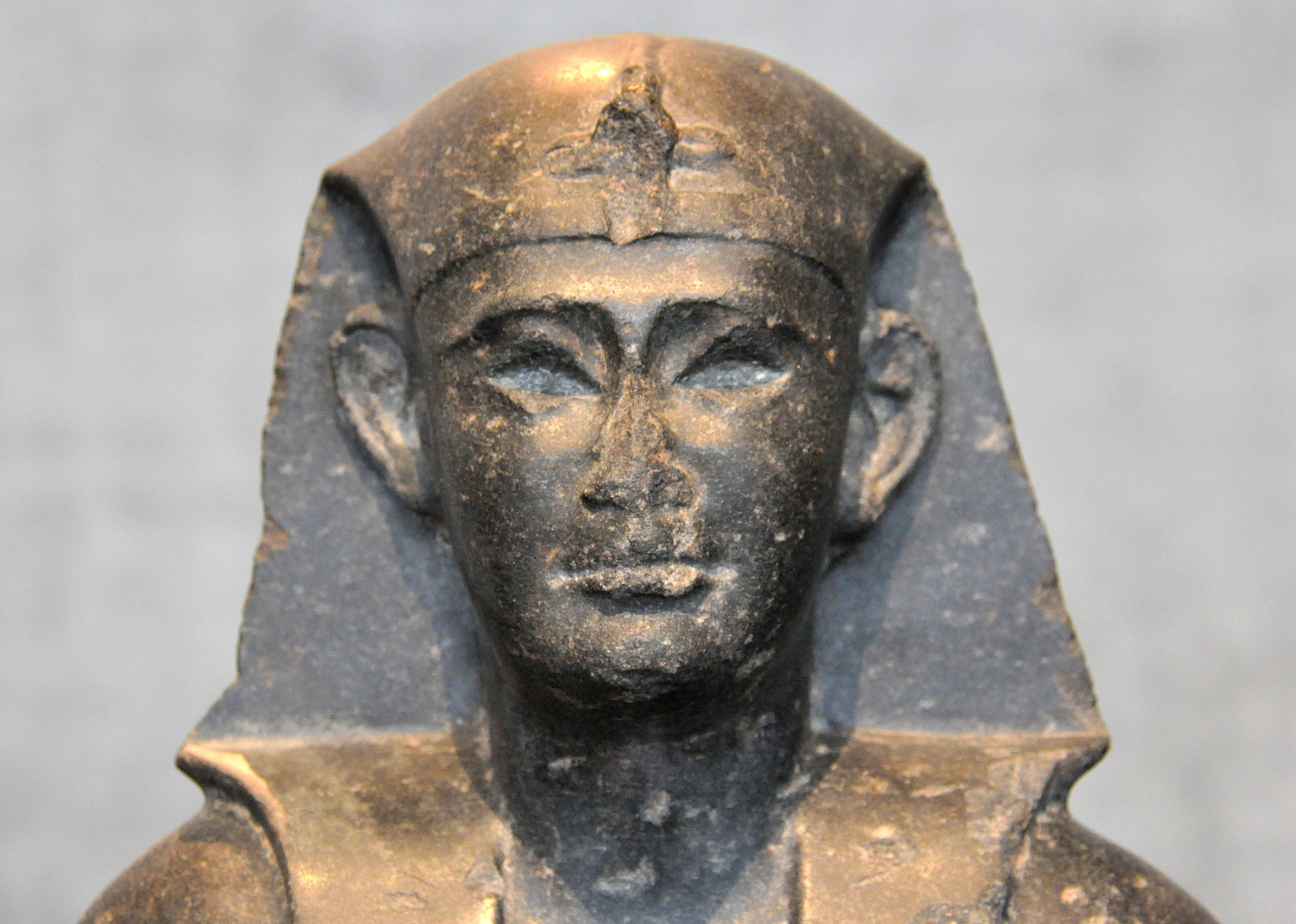
Egyptianized statue of Augustus. Roman Period. State Museum of Egyptian Art, Munich

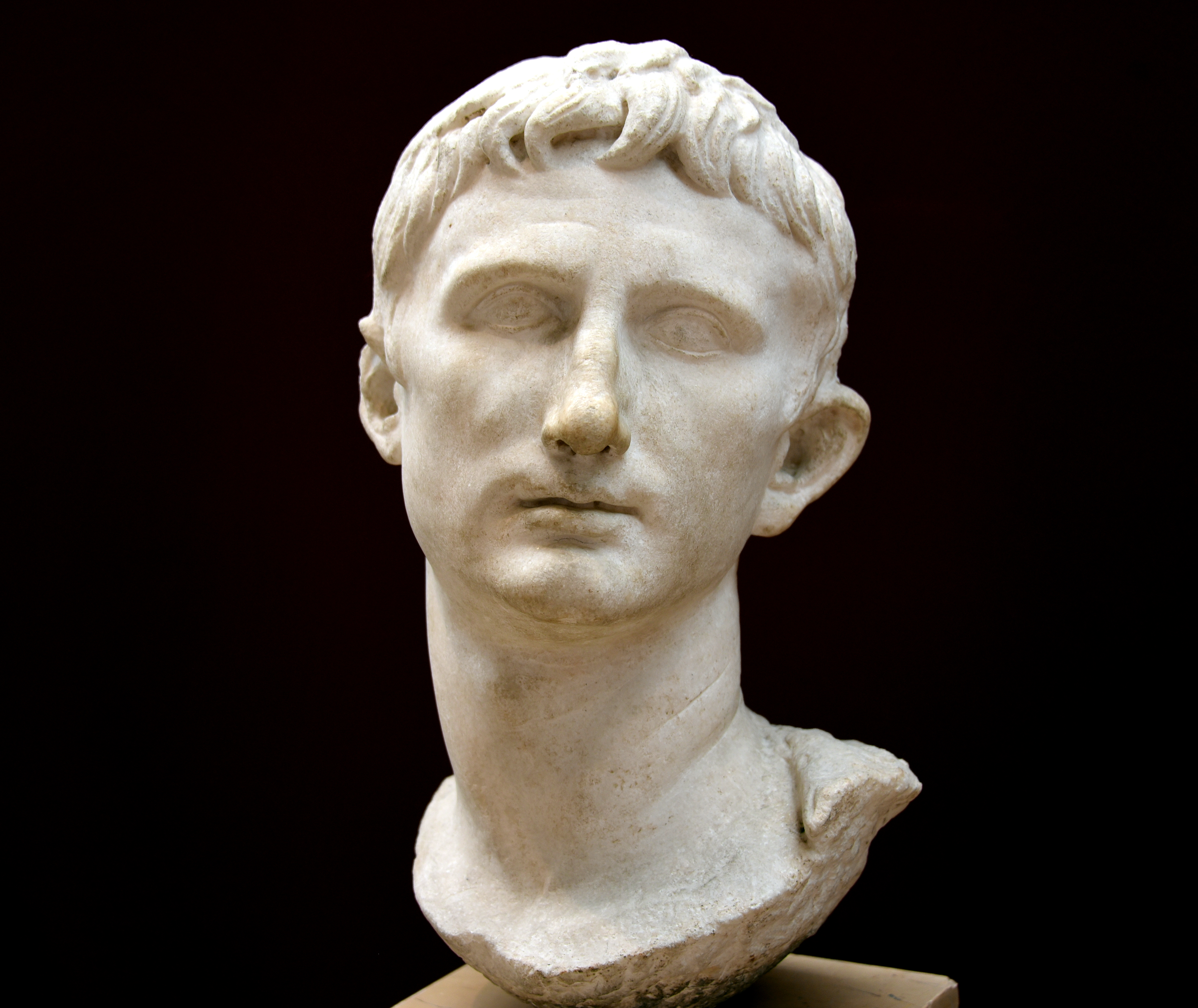
Head of Augustus from Bergama, in modern-day Turkey. Museum of Archaeology, Istanbul

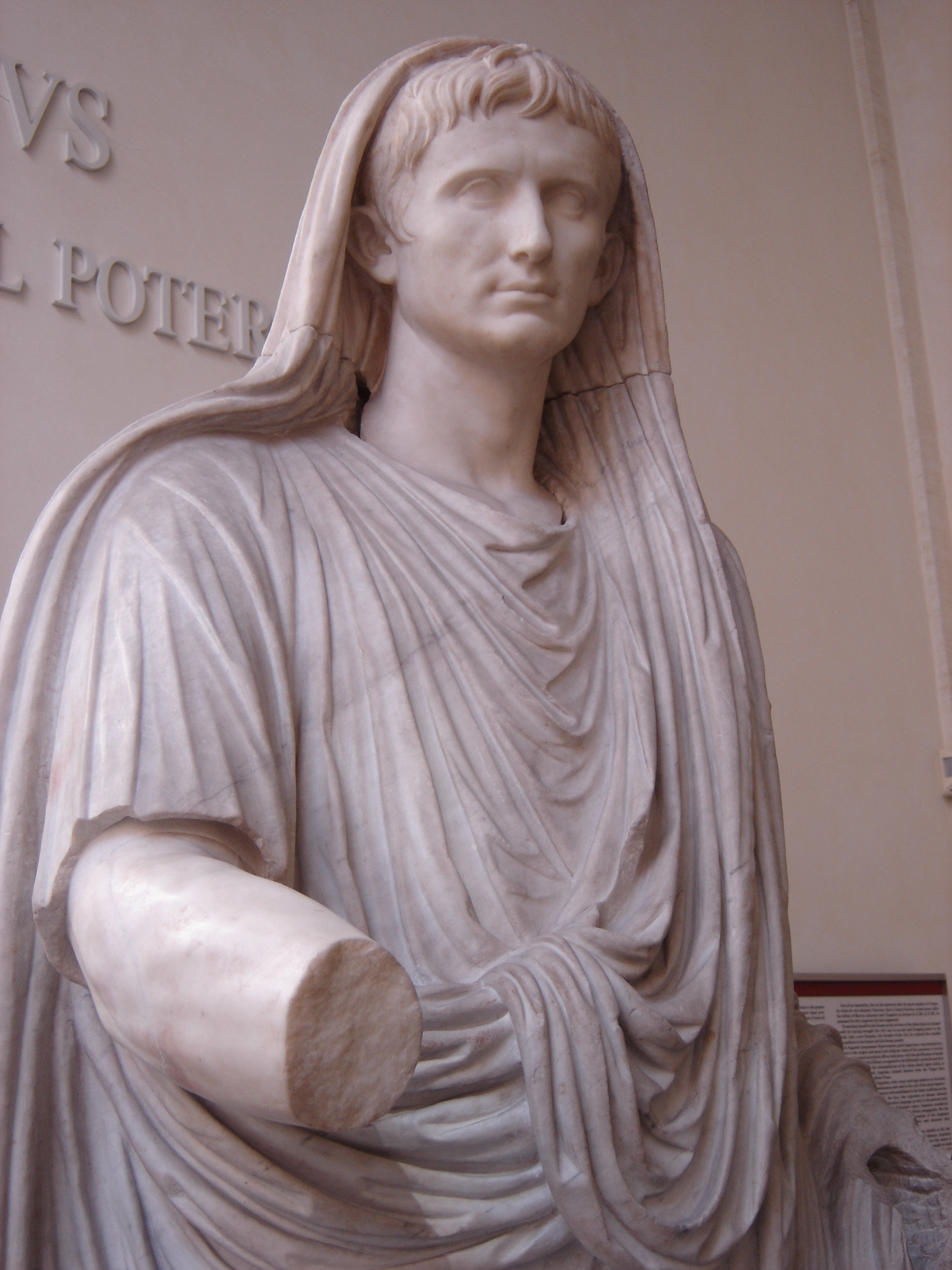
The Via Labicana statue of Augustus, closeup

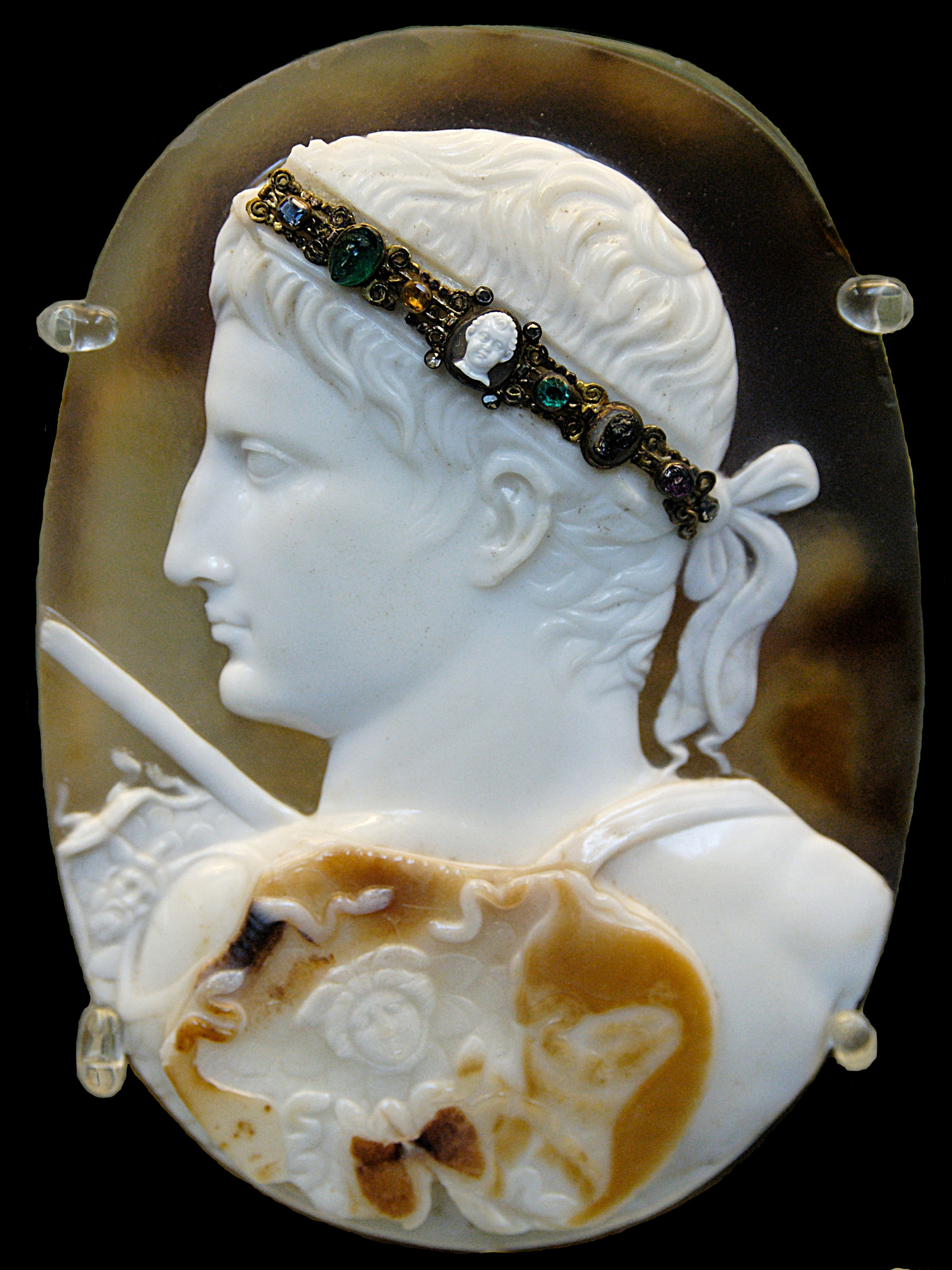
The Blacas Cameo, dated from shortly after his death in 14 AD, British Museum

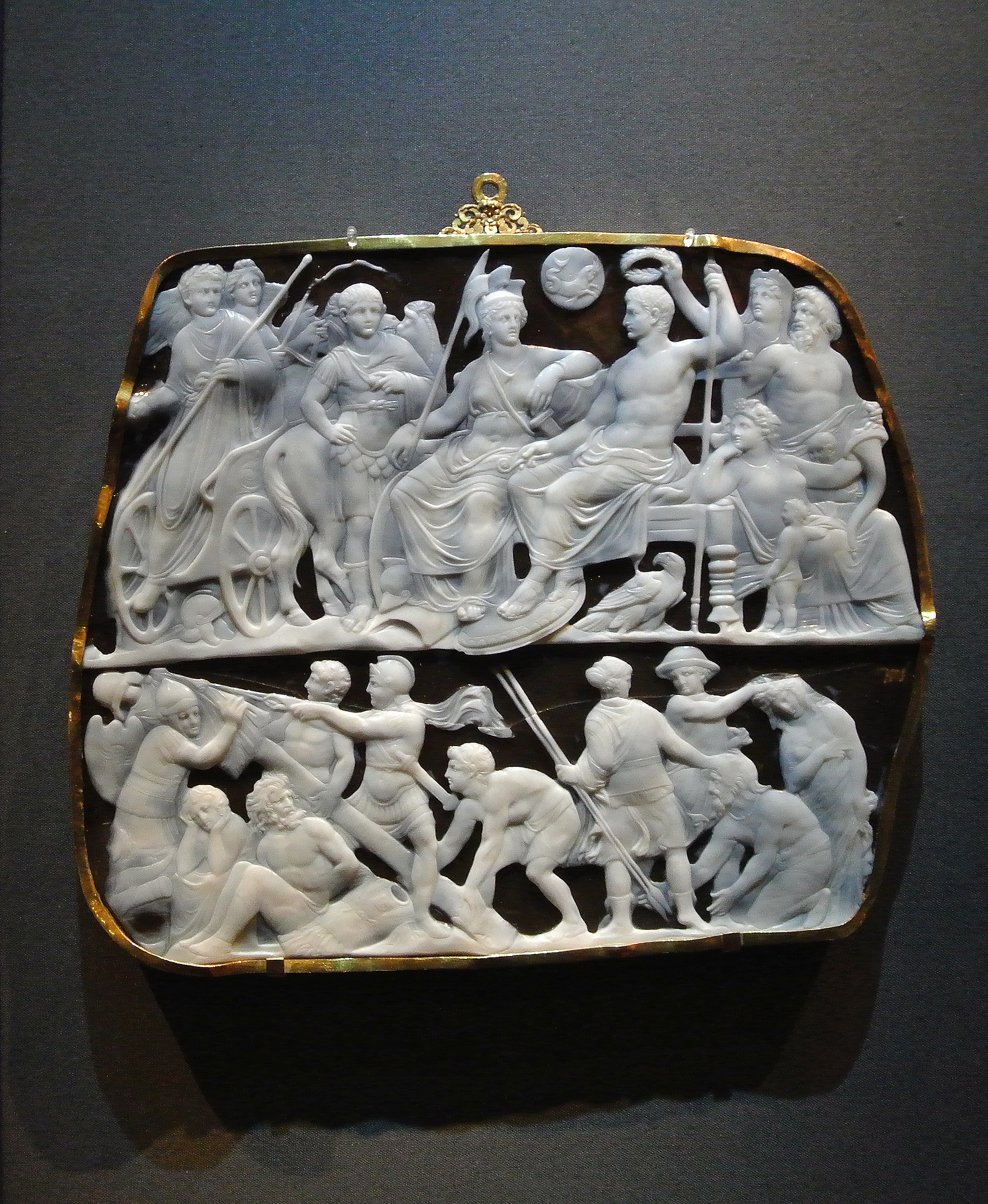
The Gemma Augustea in the Kunsthistorisches Museum, Vienna

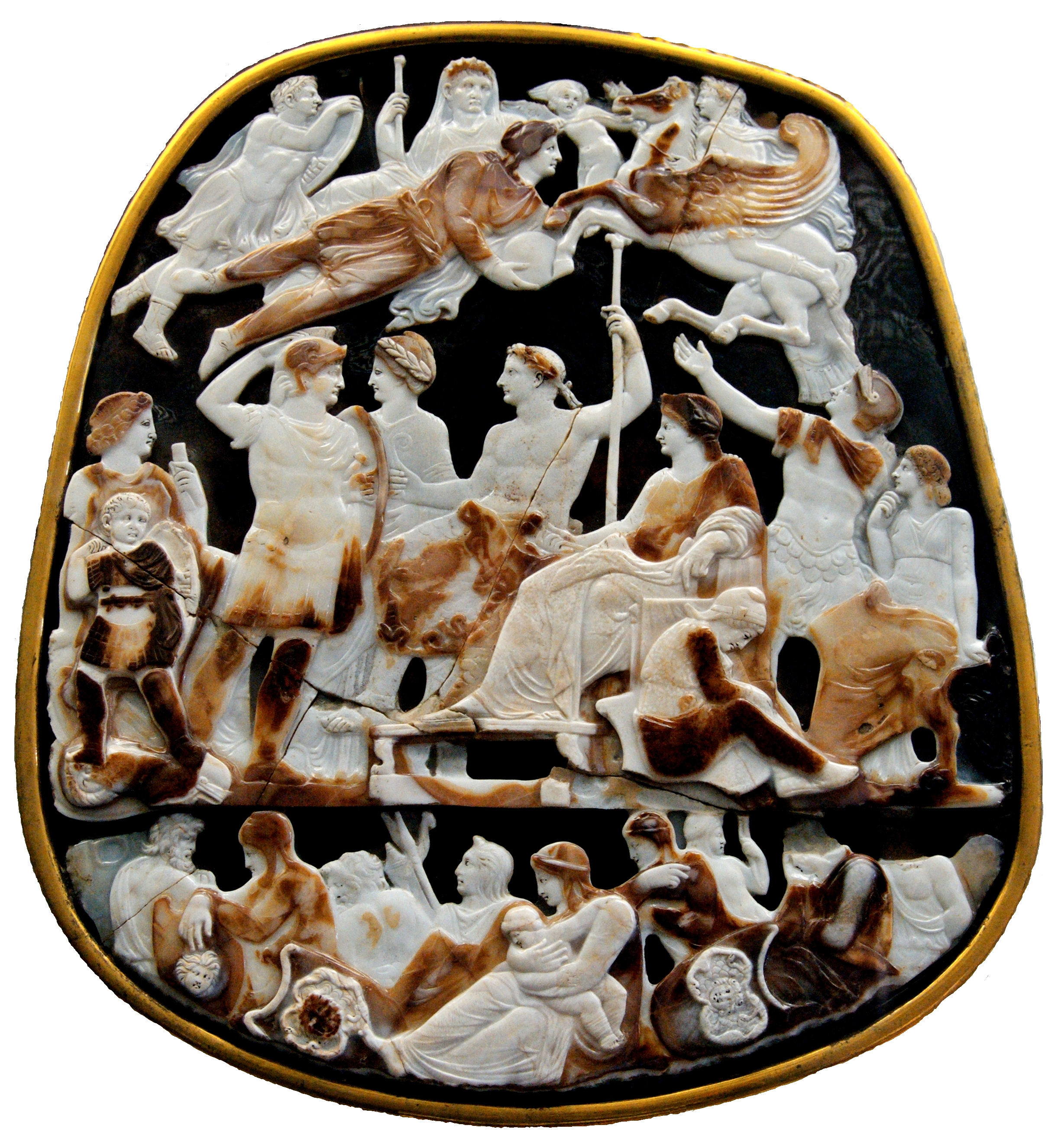
The Great Cameo of France

== Literature ==
=== Augustan ===
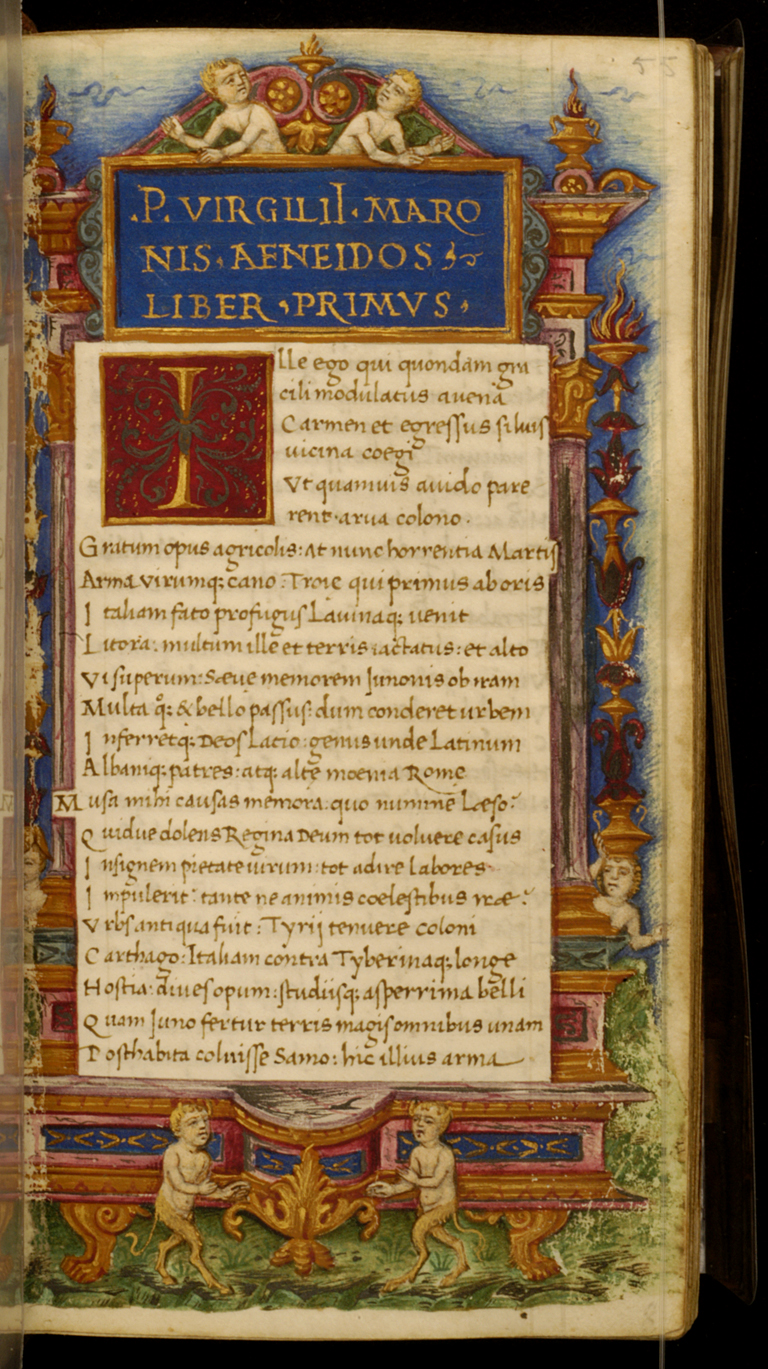
Manuscript of Virgil's masterpiece, the Aeneid, circa 1470, Cristoforo Majorana

In literary histories of the first part of the twentieth century and earlier, Augustan Literature, the pieces of Latin literature written during the reign of Augustus, was regarded along with that of the Late Republic as constituting the Golden Age of Latin literature, a period of stylistic classicism.

In the wars following Julius Caesar's assassination, a generation of Republican literary figures was lost. Cicero and his contemporaries were replaced by a new generation who spent their formative years under the old constructs and were forced to make their mark under the watchful eye of a new emperor and his quasi-culture minister, Gaius Maecenas, who was a prolific patron of the arts. The demand for great orators had ceased, shifting to an emphasis on poetry. Other than the historian Livy, the most remarkable writers of the period were the poets Virgil, Horace, and Ovid.

Augustan literature produced the most widely read, influential, and enduring of Rome's poets. Although Virgil has sometimes been considered a "court poet", his Aeneid, the most important of the Latin epics, also permits complex readings on the source and meaning of Rome's power and the responsibilities of a good leader. Ovid's works were wildly popular, but the poet was exiled by Augustus in one of literary history's great mysteries; carmen et error ("a poem" or "poetry" and "a mistake") is Ovid's own oblique explanation. Among prose works, the monumental history of Livy is preeminent for both its scope and stylistic achievement. The multi-volume work On Architecture by Vitruvius also remains of great informational interest.

In 1737, British writer Alexander Pope, who had been imitating Horace, wrote an Epistle to Augustus that was in fact addressed to George II of Great Britain and seemingly endorsed the notion of his age being like that of Augustus, when poetry became more mannered, political and satirical than in the era of Julius Caesar. Later, Voltaire and Oliver Goldsmith (in his History of Literature in 1764) used the term "Augustan" to refer to the poetry and literature of the 1720s and the 1730s in Britain.

=== Biblical ===
- In the Bible, Augustus is mentioned by name in Luke 2:1. According to the Gospel of Luke, Augustus ordered a census be conducted of the ".. entire Roman World" and this is the reason that Joseph and Mary, who lived in Nazareth, were in Bethlehem when Jesus was born. Joseph is described as a descendant of King David, who was born in Bethlehem, and, as such, Joseph was required to register his family in Bethlehem.
- The Tribute Penny, the coin that was shown to Jesus when he made his famous "Render unto Caesar..." speech, is usually thought to be a Roman denarius with the head of Tiberius, Augustus' successor. The inscription reads "Ti[berivs] Caesar Divi Avg[vsti] F[ilivs] Avgvstvs" ("Caesar Augustus Tiberius, son of the Divine Augustus"), claiming that after death Augustus had become a god. However, it has been suggested by some scholars that denarii were not in common circulation in Judaea during Jesus' lifetime and that the coin was more probably an Antiochan tetradrachm bearing the head of Tiberius, with Augustus on the reverse. Another suggestion often made is the denarius of Augustus with Gaius and Lucius on the reverse, while coins of Julius Caesar, Mark Antony and Germanicus are all considered possibilities.

=== Medieval ===
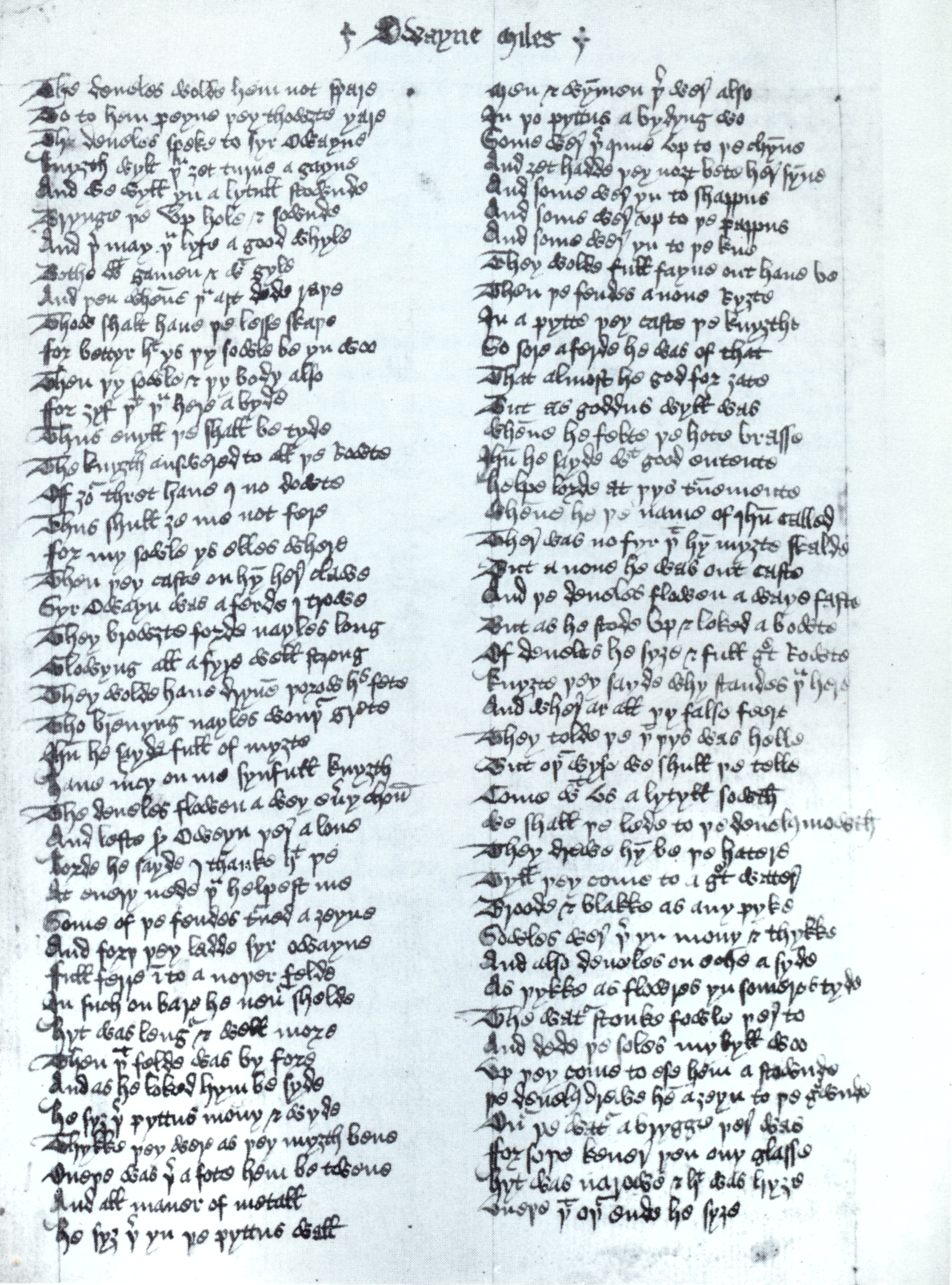
A page from a fifteenth-century Middle English manuscript of Octavian, found in the British Library

- In the Golden Legend, among other works from the Middle Ages, a legendary meeting between Augustus and the Tiburtine Sibyl is recounted. According to the story, Augustus inquires of the Sibyl whether he should be worshipped as a god. In response, the Sibyl reveals to Augustus a vision of the Virgin and the Christ Child, who will eclipse all Roman gods.
- Augustus is mentioned several times in Dante Alighieri's epic poem, the Divine Comedy (c. 1308–1321):
  - He is called "the good Augustus" by Virgil, a Roman poet of the Augustan period, who appears as the author's guide through Hell and Purgatory. Inf. I, 71.
  - Augustus is said to have taken charge of Virgil's physical and literary remains after his death. "My bones were buried by Octavian." Purg. VII, 6.
  - His triumphant chariot is compared to the chariot in the Pageant of the Church Triumphant. Purg. XXIX, 116.
- Augustus (as Octavian) appears in two of Geoffrey Chaucer's fourteenth-century works: The Book of the Duchess and The Legend of Good Women.
- Augustus (as Octavian) is the title character of a fourteenth-century Middle English verse translation and abridgement of a mid-13th century Old French romance of the same name by an unknown author. The story describes a trauma that unfolds in the household of Octavian, whose own mother deceives him into sending his wife and his two newborn sons into exile and likely death. After many adventures, the family are at last reunited and the guilty mother is appropriately punished.

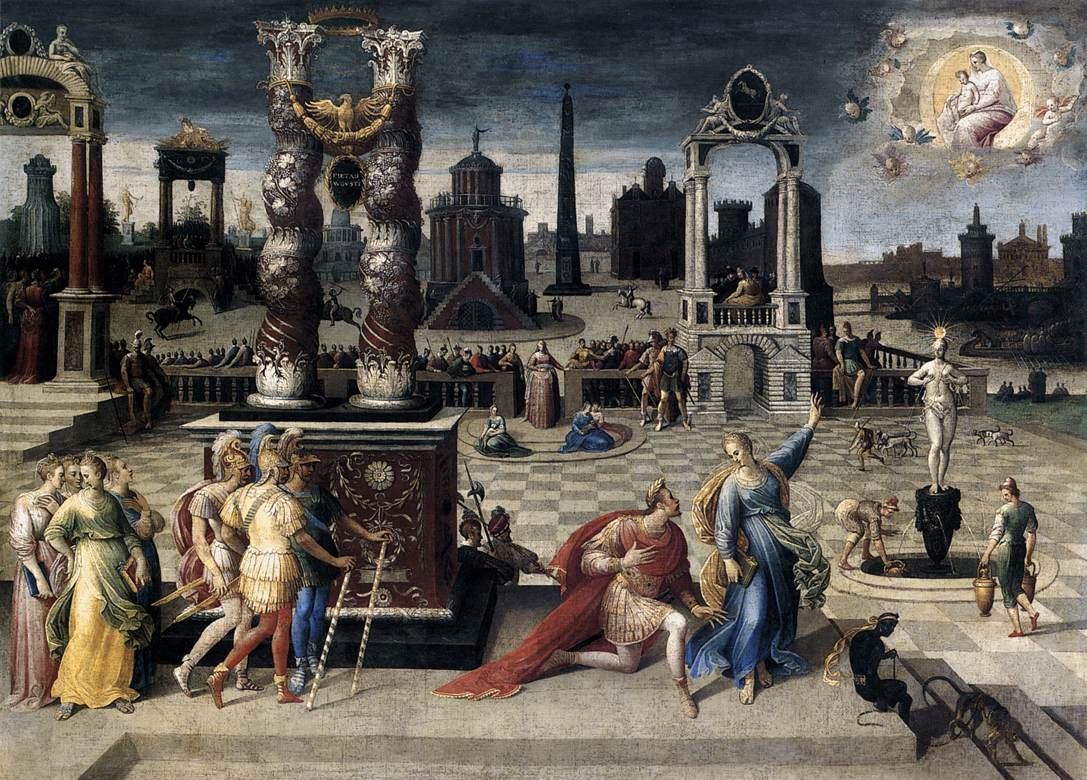
Augustus and the Sibyl, by Antoine Caron, Louvre

=== Modern ===
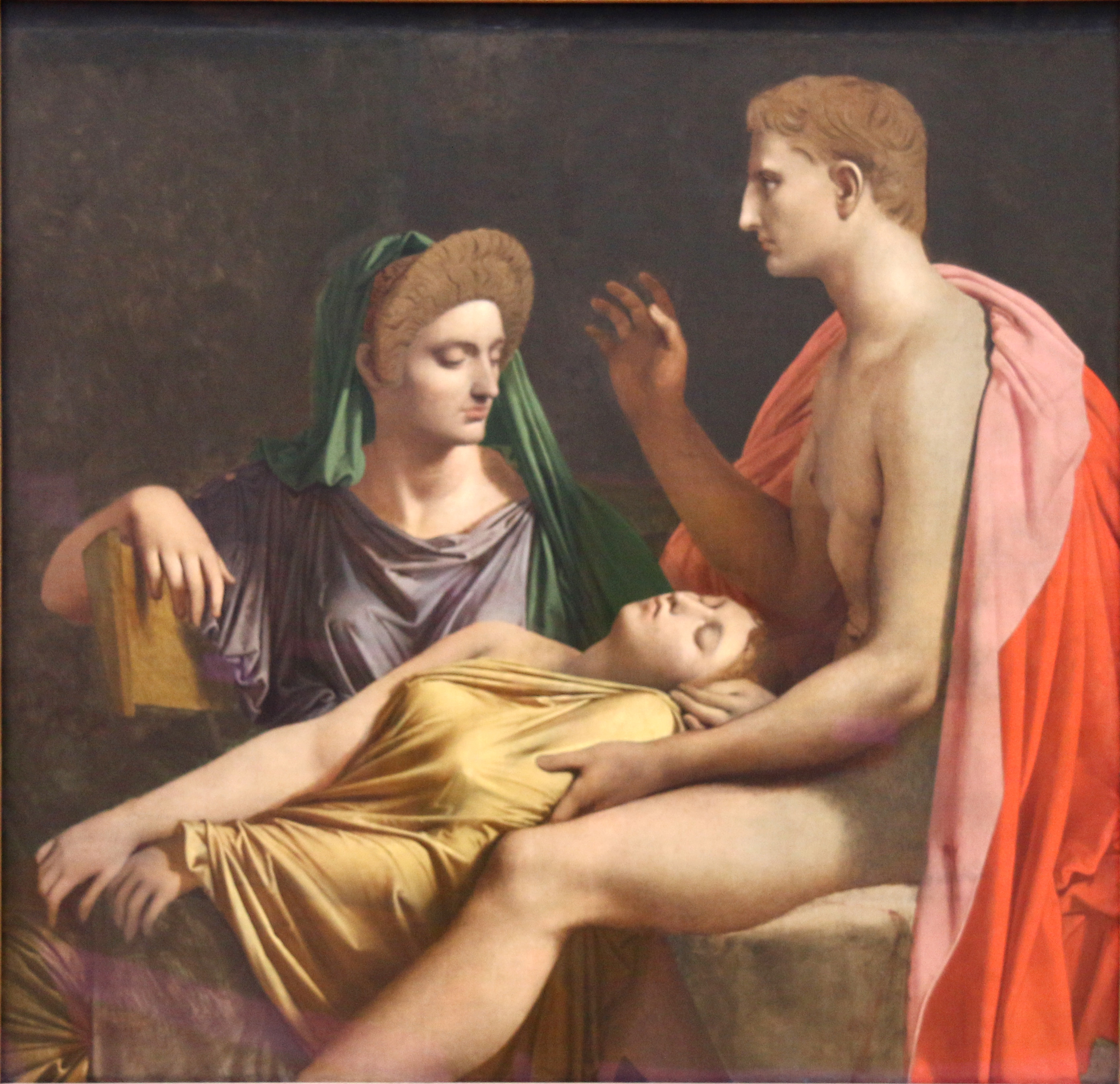
Augustus listening to the reading of The Aeneid by Jean-Auguste-Dominique Ingres (1812, later reworked). Over the course of 53 years, Ingres revisited this scene from antiquity in over 100 drawings and watercolours and three oil paintings.

- The 1934 historical fiction novel I, Claudius by Robert Graves has Augustus play a central role. Augustus is depicted as being a well-meaning ruler, who genuinely desires to retire from his status as Emperor and restore the Republic, but is driven by Livia into not doing so. Towards the end of his life, Augustus recognizes the sins of Livia and attempts to stave her off and declare Postumus Agrippa his heir, leading Livia to poison Augustus. Augustus deals with numerous heartbreaks, the greatest of which is his banishment of his daughter Julia for her numerous adulteries.
- Augustus plays an important role in Elisabeth Dored's 1959 romance novel I Loved Tiberius.
- Augustus is an example in an important speech in Kurt Vonnegut's 1965 book God Bless You, Mr. Rosewater.
- A bust of Augustus has an important role in The Mystery of the Fiery Eye (1967) of the Three Investigators series.
- John Edward Williams wrote a novel titled Augustus which won the 1973 National Book Award.
- Allan Massie's 1986 novel Augustus purported to be an autobiography of the Roman emperor.
- Augustus is a supporting character in Margaret George's 1997 novel The Memoirs of Cleopatra.
- Augustus is a significant figure in Edward Burton's 1999 historical novel Caesar's Daughter.
- Augustus, under the name of Gaius Octavius, plays a key role in the last two novels in Colleen McCullough's Masters of Rome series. The later stages of The October Horse (2002) chronicle the emergence of Octavian, while Antony and Cleopatra (2007) spans the years 41-27 B.C. In the latter novel, Octavian and his wife, Livia, are depicted as pragmatic to the point of total ruthlessness but not needlessly cruel.
- Augustus is mentioned in several of Harry Turtledove's alternative history novels, in particular Gunpowder Empire (2003), and features prominently in Turtledove's historical novel Give Me Back My Legions! (2009). The title of the 2009 novel refers to Augustus' alleged words in the aftermath of the Battle of the Teutoburg Forest, in which he was so devastated by the annihilation of three Roman legions that he spent the next several weeks in a stupour, repeating the phrase Quintili Vare, legiones redde! (Quintilius Varus, give me back my legions!).
- The fifth book in Conn Iggulden's historical fiction series, Emperor, entitled The Blood of Gods (2013), deals with the rise of Augustus and events after Julius Caesar's assassination.
- Augustus (as Octavian) is an important character in Robert Harris' 2015 historical novel Dictator, which chronicles the last fifteen years of Cicero's life. Octavian also features in the 2017 stage adaptation of the novel.
- Augustus (first as Octavian, then as Augustus) plays a central role in Michael Livingston's historical fantasy novels The Shards of Heaven (2015) and The Gates of Hell (2016).
- Augustus is a central character in the DC Comics graphic novel The Sandman installment #30, titled "August" (issue collected in The Sandman: Fables & Reflections).
- Augustus also features in several alternate history short stories, most notably Alternate Tyrants, Alternate Generals III and What If? 2.

== Later art ==
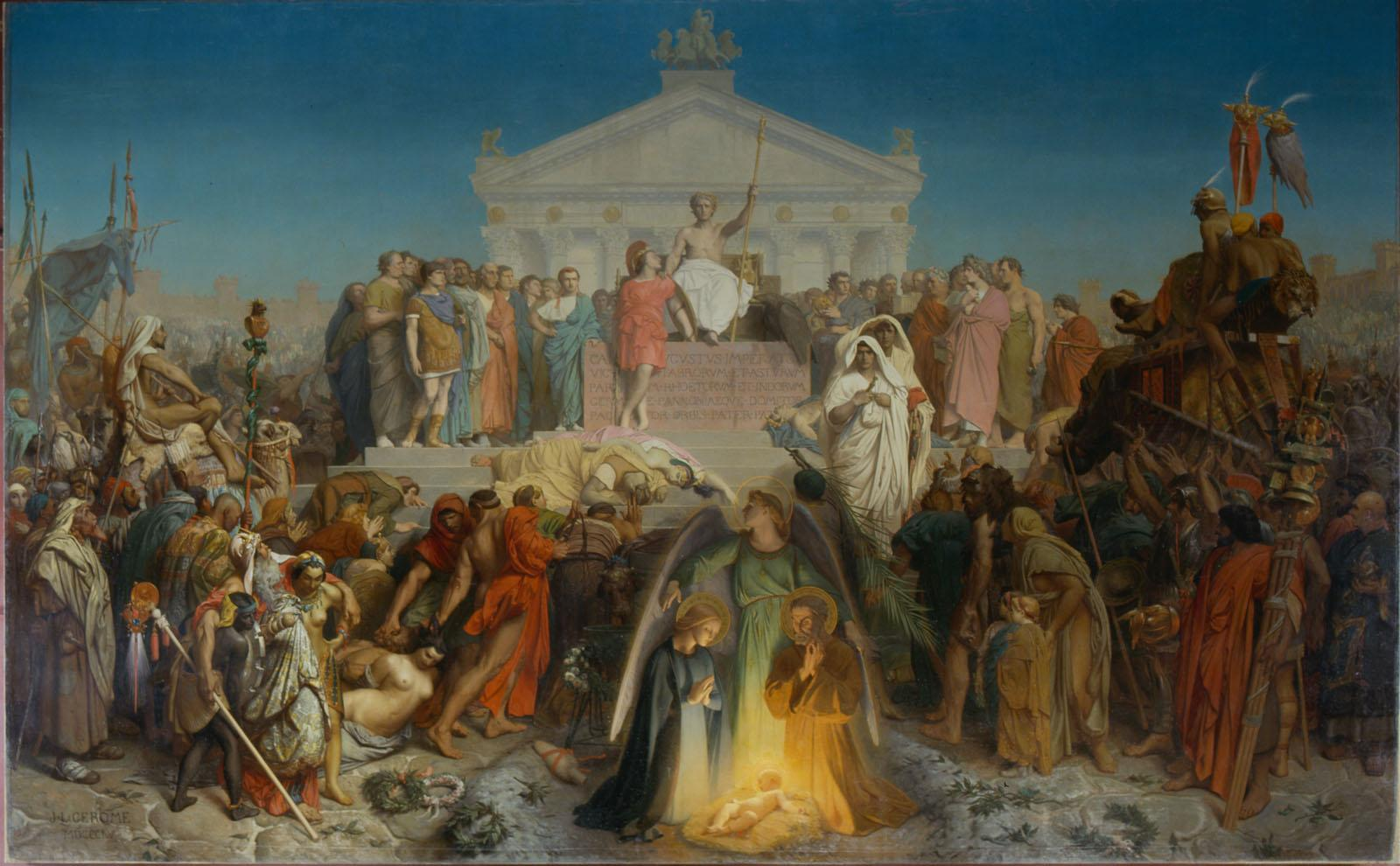
The Age of Augustus, the Birth of Christ, c. 1852–1854, Musée de Picardie

- A Roman engraved gem cameo is prominently re-used on the Cross of Lothair (c. 1000).
- Adoration of the Christ Child (c.1485) by Bramantino.
- The mythic meeting of Augustus with the Tiburtine Sibyl was often depicted by artists from the late Middle Ages onwards. Artists who are known to have depicted this meeting include the Master of the Tiburtine Sibyl, Antonio da Trento, Jan van Scorel, Philip Galle, Antoine Caron and Wolfgang Katzheimer.
- Eleven Caesars (1536–1540) by Titian.
- Augustus und Kleopatra (1761) by Anton Raphael Mengs.
- Cléopâtre et Octavian (1788) by Louis Gauffier.
- Augustus features in Jean-Auguste-Dominique Ingres's painting Virgil reading The Aeneid before Augustus, Livia and Octavia (1812). The painting is based on an anecdote, recorded in the late fourth-century vita of the poet Virgil by Aelius Donatus, in which the poet recites Book VI of his Aeneid to Augustus, his wife Livia and his sister Octavia, and mentions the name of Octavia's dead son, Marcellus, causing Octavia to faint. This anecdote has also been depicted in works by other artists, including Jean-Joseph Taillasson, Antonio Zucchi, Jean-Baptiste Wicar, Jean-Bruno Gassies and Angelica Kaufmann.
- The Age of Augustus, the Birth of Christ (c. 1852–1854) by Jean-Léon Gérôme.
- Equestrian statue of Augustus (2007), in Mérida, Spain.

== Temples and monuments ==
The Romans celebrated Augustus on a variety of honorific monuments; he was also worshipped as a divine or semi-divine figure in temples in many parts of the Roman Empire.

The Mausoleum of Augustus in Rome was long a neglected and ruined structure, buried beneath a hill. It has been excavated in recent years. It formed part of a large garden complex, with other buildings including the Ara Pacis.

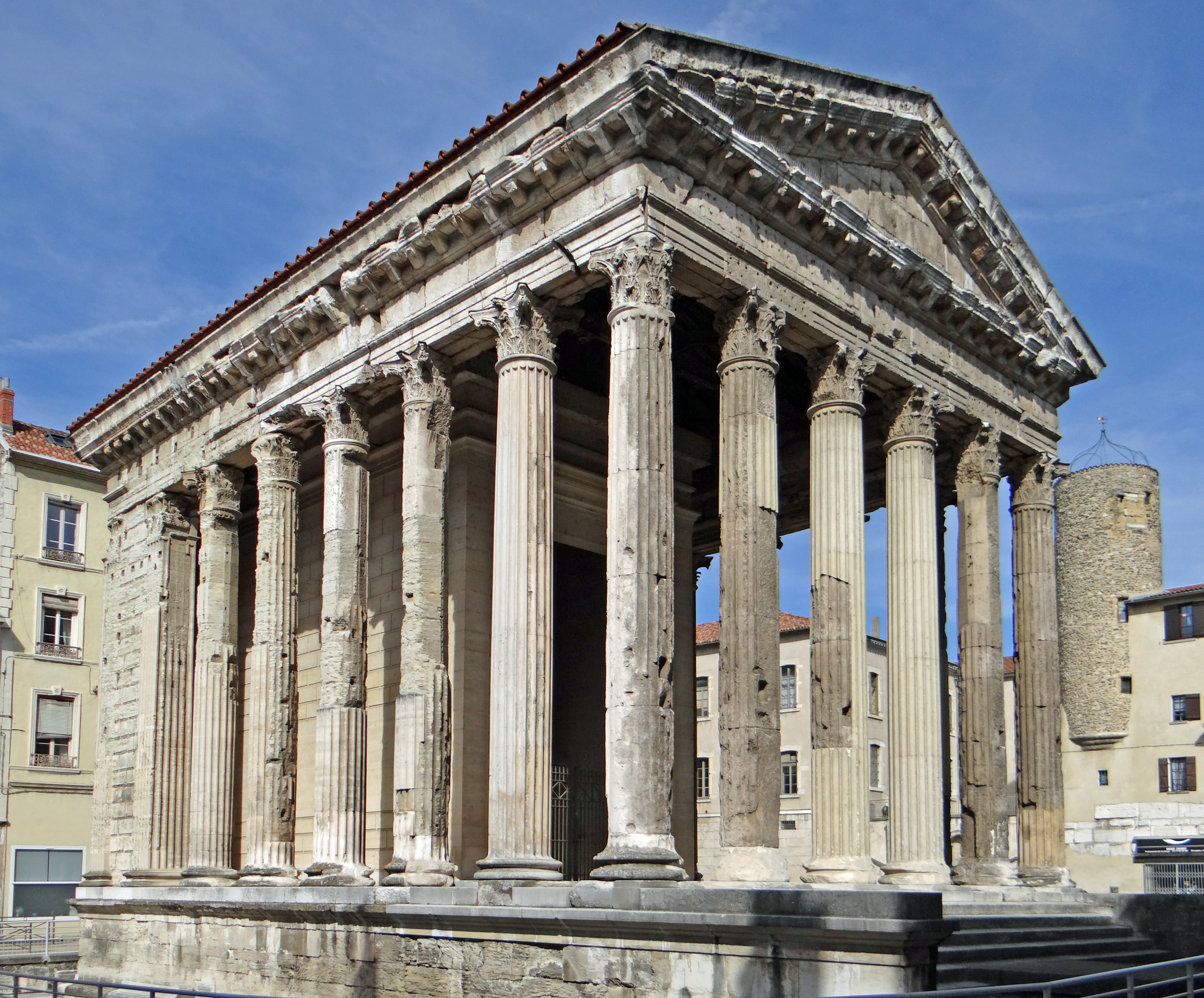
Temple of Augustus and Livia in Vienne, France

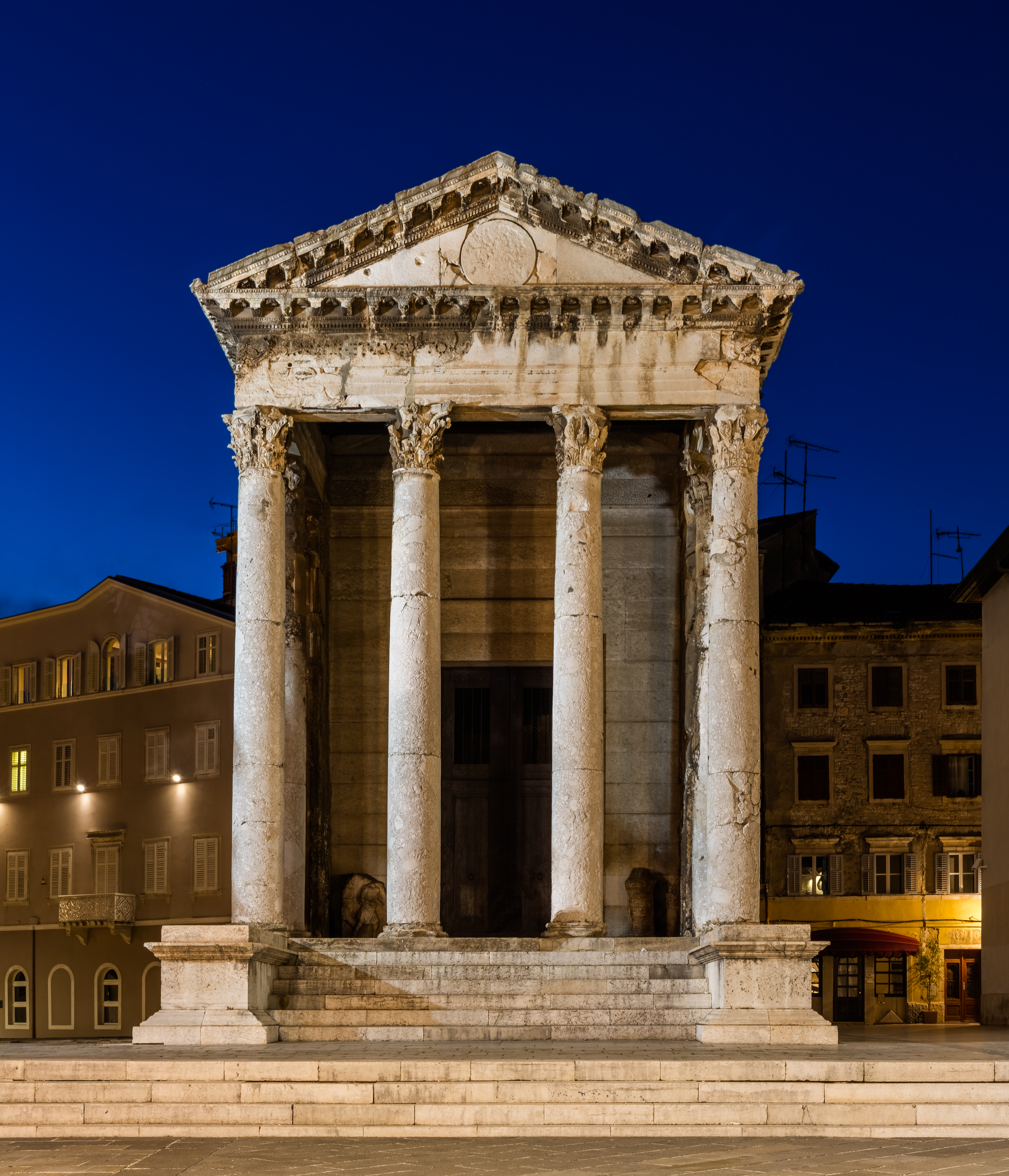
Temple of Augustus in Pula, Croatia. One of the best-preserved temples dedicated to Augustus

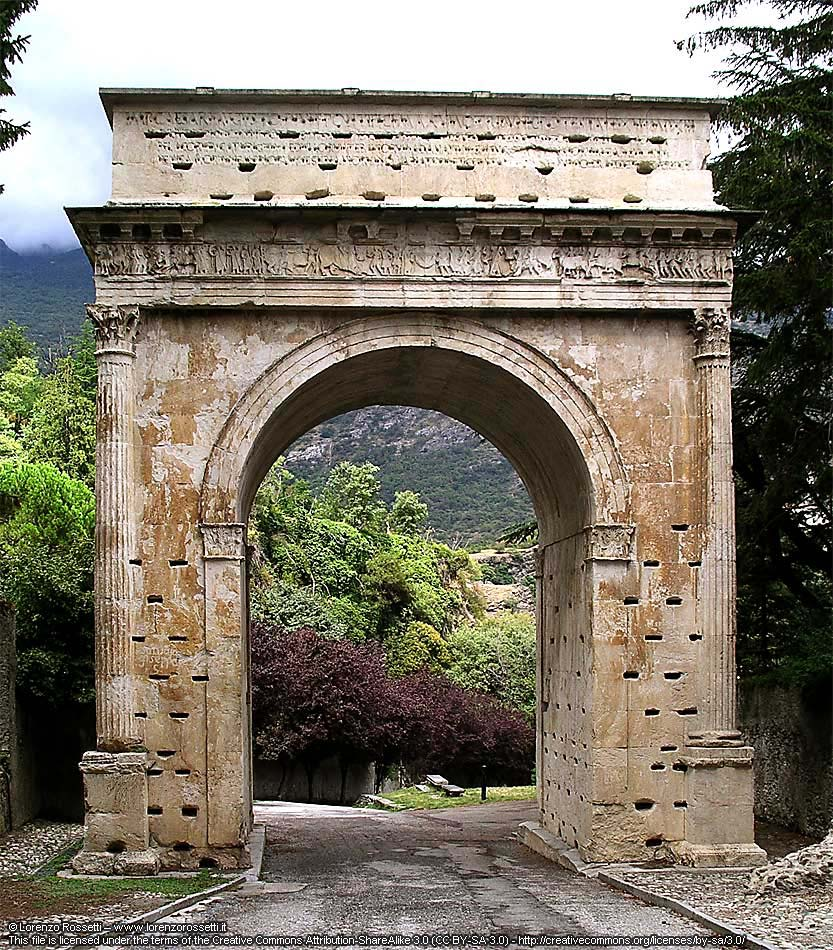
Arch of Augustus in the city of Susa in the province of Turin. One of the best-preserved arches dedicated to Augustus

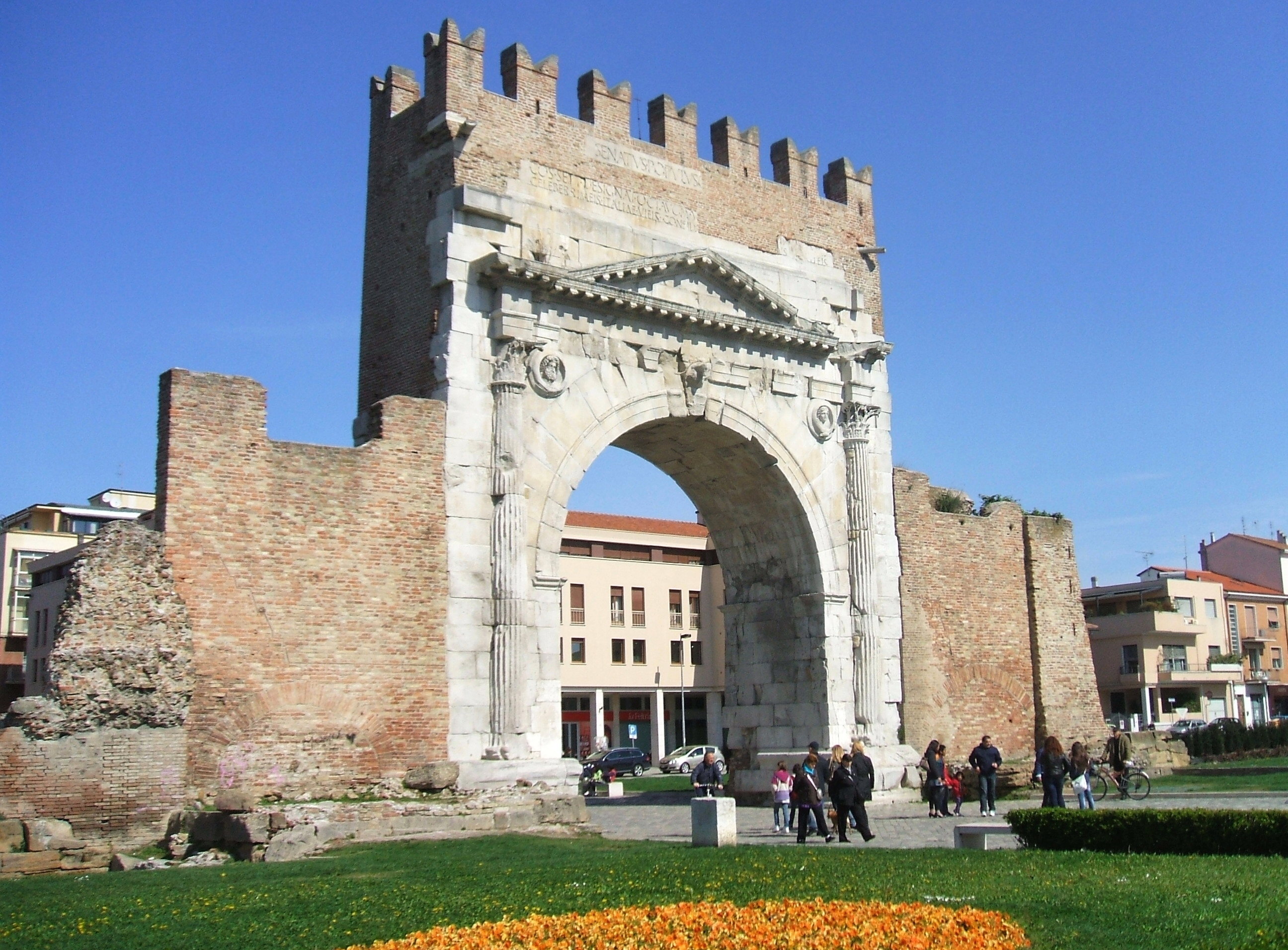
Provincial Arch of Augustus in Rimini

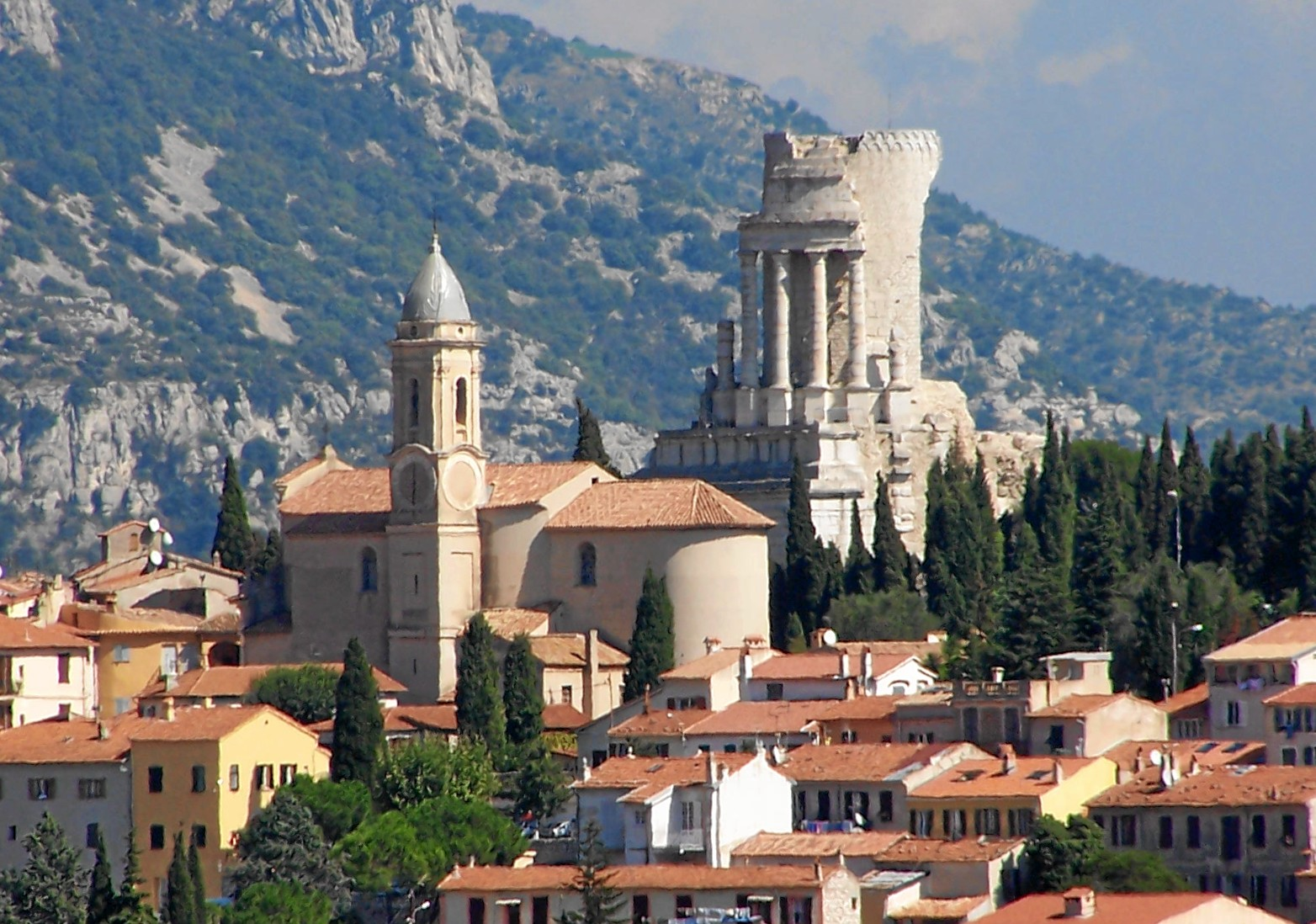
The Trophy of Augustus in La Turbie, France

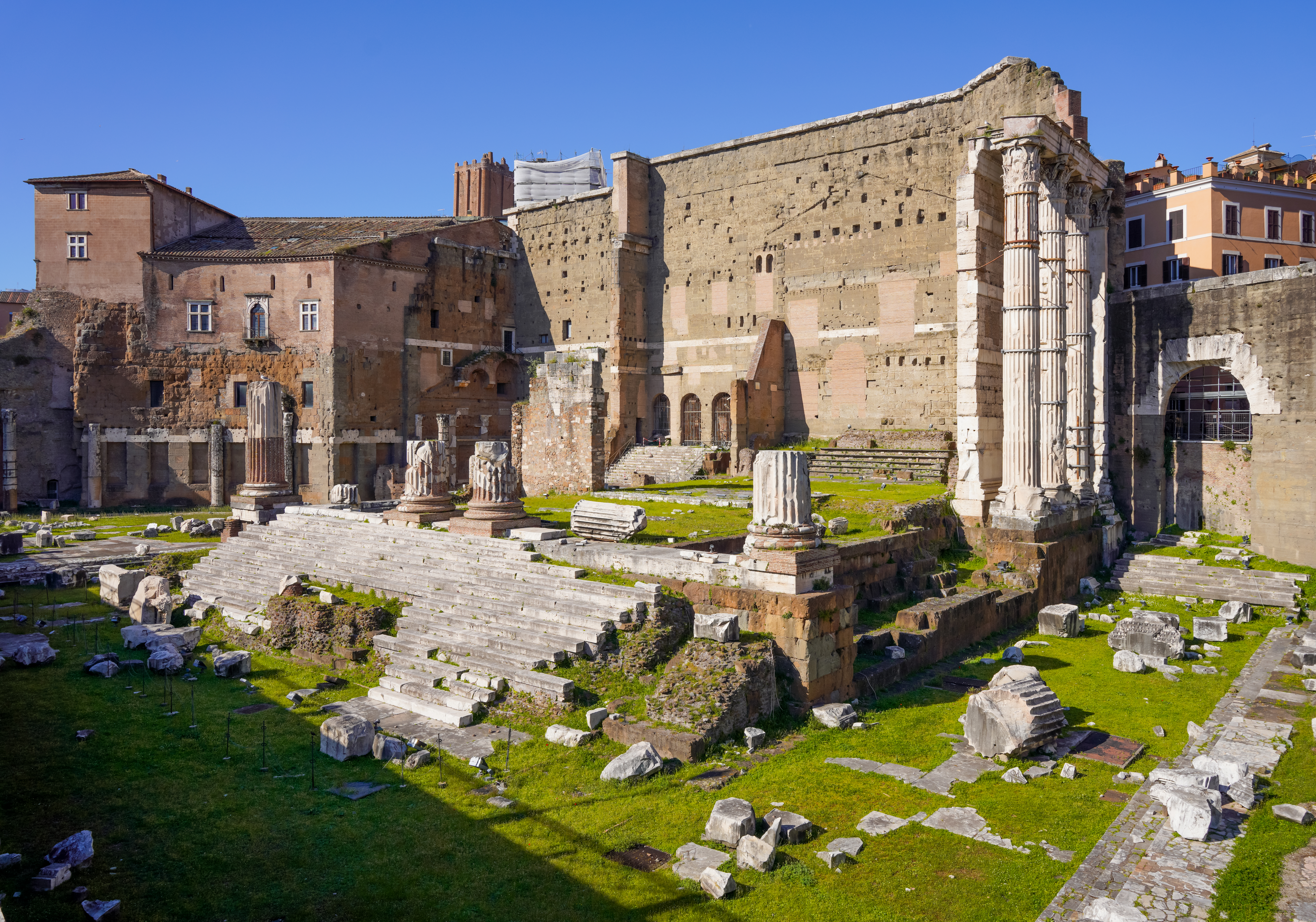
Remains of the Forum of Augustus containing the Temple of Mars Ultor

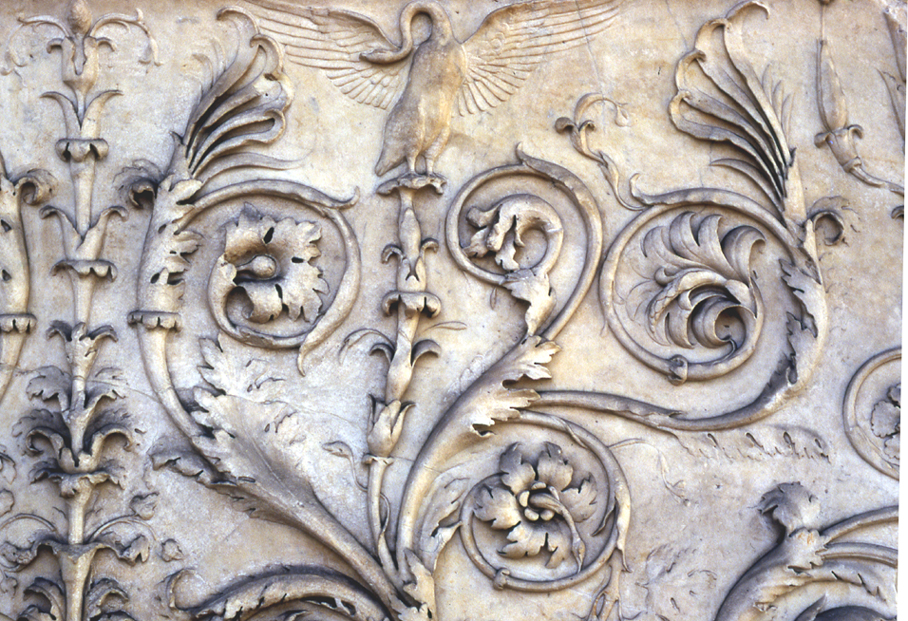
Close up on the sculpted detail of the Ara Pacis (Altar of Peace)

== Theater ==
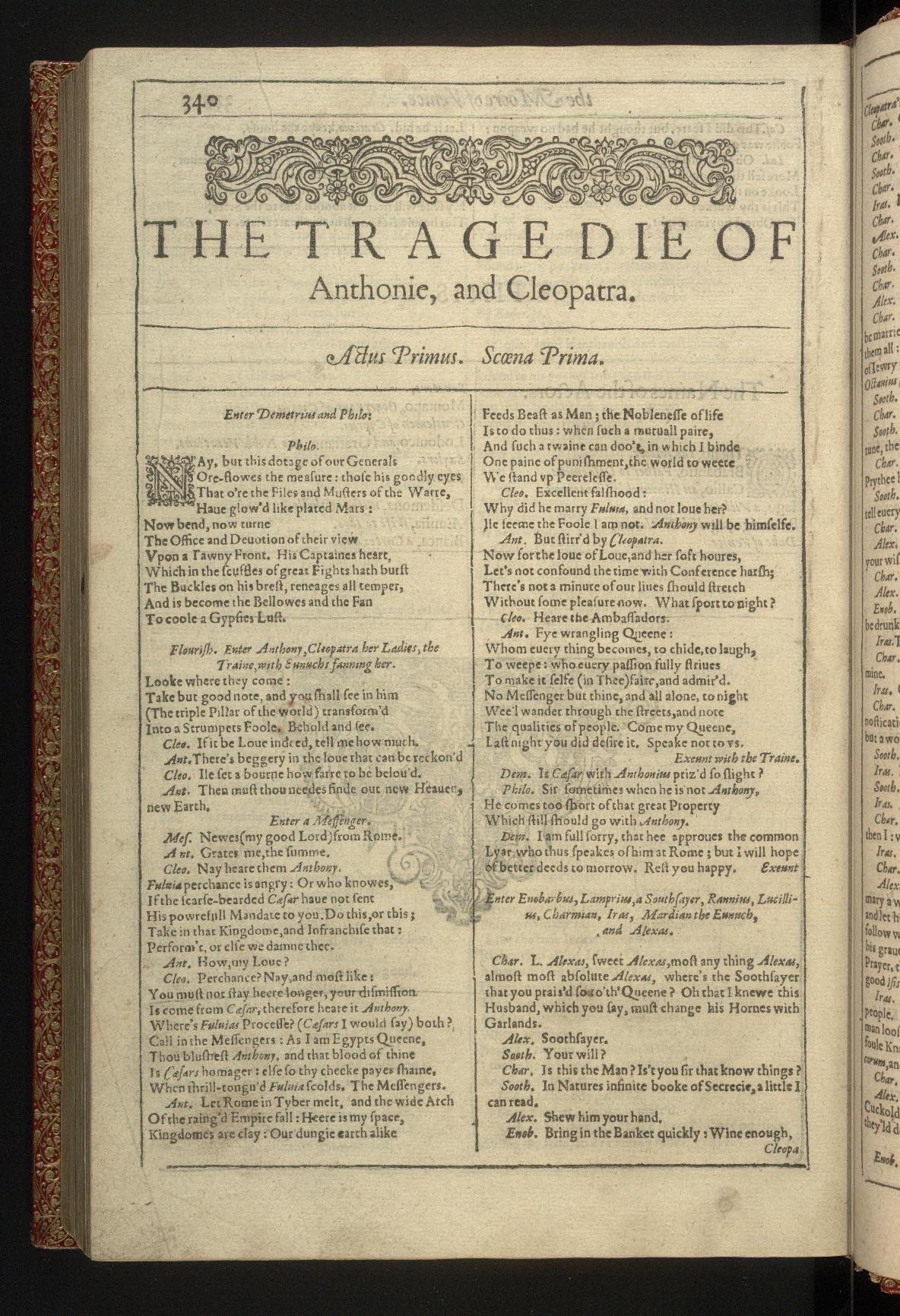
The first page of Antony and Cleopatra from the First Folio of Shakespeare's plays, published in 1623

- Augustus is a notable supporting character in William Shakespeare's plays Julius Caesar and Antony and Cleopatra, in which he is called Octavius and Caesar respectively. Augustus' cold, ruthless personality contrasts starkly with Antony's romantic tendencies.
- Augustus is a central character in Pierre Corneille's 1641 play Cinna, which favourably depicts the emperor's clemency.
- Augustus is the central character in Nathaniel Lee's 1676 tragedy Gloriana, also known as The Court of Augustus Caesar, and was originally played by Michael Mohun.
- Augustus also plays an important role in John Dryden's 1677 heroic drama, All for Love, although he never actually appears on stage.
- Augustus features in the Dutch stage adaptation of William Shakespeare's plays Coriolanus, Julius Caesar, and Antony and Cleopatra, entitled Roman Tragedies. The adaptation was created in 2007 by Toneelgroep Amsterdam, the theatre company of Amsterdam, and has been performed at venues worldwide. Augustus is played by a woman, in order to reflect the existence today of several prominent female politicians.

== Opera ==
- Julius Caesar (1851) by Robert Schumann.
- Cleopatra (1876) by Lauro Rossi.
- Cléopâtre (1914) by Louis Payen.
- Antony and Cleopatra (1966) by Samuel Barber.
- I, Claudius and Claudius the God (2019) by Igor Escudero.

== Film ==
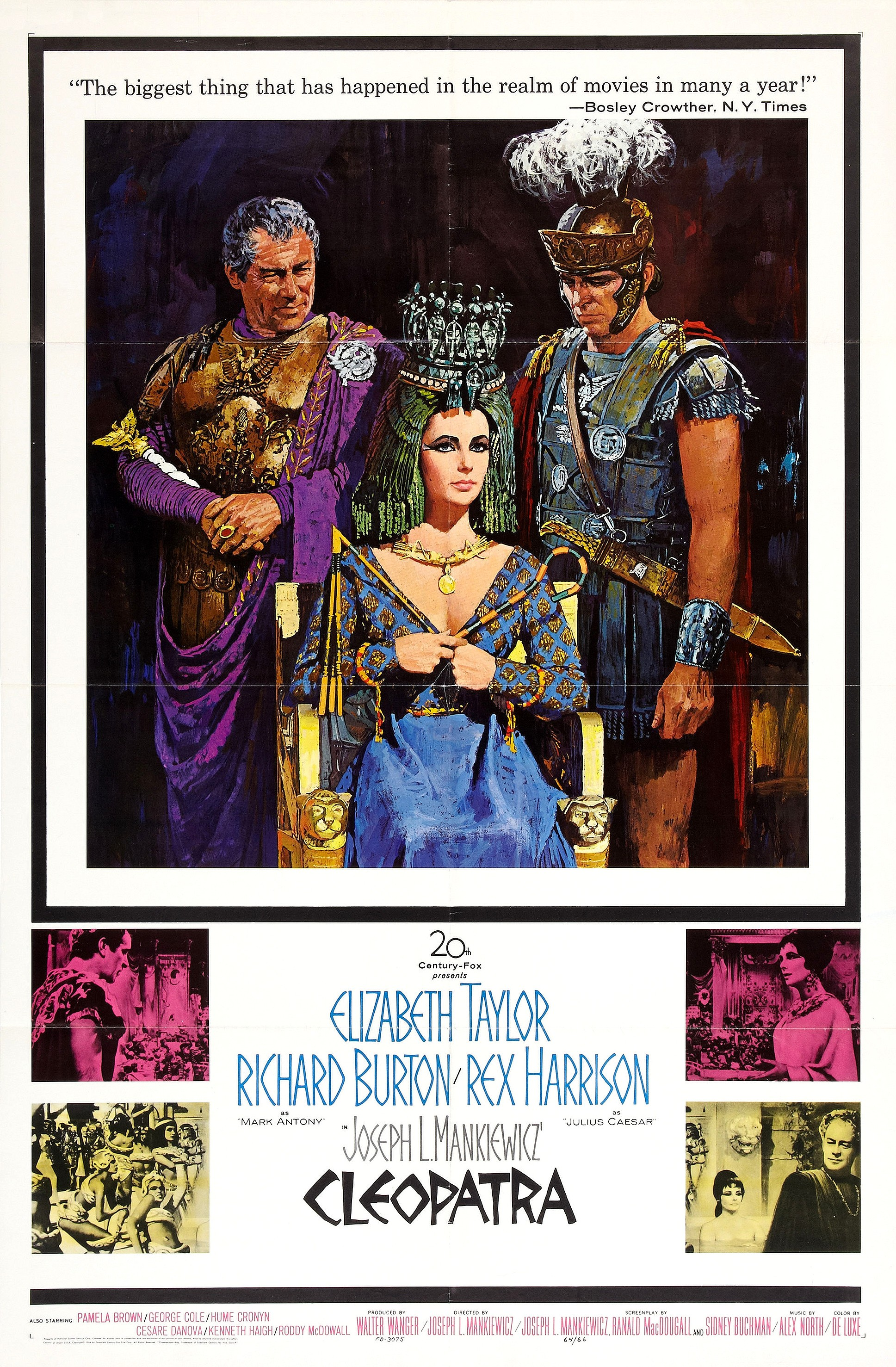
Original theatrical release poster of the 1963 film Cleopatra

Portrayals of Octavian/Augustus in film:

- Antony and Cleopatra (1908), portrayed by William V. Ranous.
- Antony and Cleopatra (1913), portrayed by Ignazio Lupi.
- Cleopatra (1917), portrayed by Henri De Vries.
- Cleopatra (1934), portrayed by Ian Keith.
- I, Claudius (1937), portrayed by Roy Emerton.
- The Boys from Syracuse (1940), portrayed by Tom Dugan.
- The Private Life of Mark Antony and Cleopatra (1947), portrayed by Victor Junco.
- Julius Caesar (1950), portrayed by Bob Holt.
- Julius Caesar (1953), portrayed by Douglass Watson.
- Serpent of the Nile (1953), portrayed by Michael Fox.
- Herod the Great (1958), portrayed by Massimo Girotti.
- Antony and Cleopatra (1959), portrayed by Kevin Miles.
- Cleopatra (1963), portrayed by Roddy McDowall.
- Toto and Cleopatra (1963), portrayed by Gianni Agus.
- Julius Caesar (1970), portrayed by Richard Chamberlain.
- Cleopatra (1970), portrayed by Nachi Nozawa.
- Antony and Cleopatra (1972), portrayed by John Castle.
- Antony and Cleopatra (1974), portrayed by Corin Redgrave.
- Los Cántabros (1980), portrayed by Andrés Resino.
- Cleopatra (1999), portrayed by Rupert Graves.
- Cleopatra (2007), portrayed by Heitor Martinez.
- Zulfiqar (2016), portrayed by Ankush Hazra.

== Television ==
- Augustus is played by David William in the 1963 BBC miniseries The Spread of the Eagle.
- Augustus is played by Roland Culver in the 1968 BBC miniseries The Caesars.
- In the 1969 Play of the Month production of William Shakespeare's Julius Caesar, Augustus (as Octavius) is portrayed by John Alderton.
- Augustus is portrayed in the celebrated BBC 1976 dramatization of Robert Graves' novel I, Claudius by Brian Blessed. It is implied in the dramatization that he was poisoned to death by Livia.
- Augustus appears twice in the BBC Television Shakespeare series. He is portrayed first by Garrick Hagon in the 1979 adaptation of Julius Caesar, and then by Ian Charleson in the 1981 production of Antony and Cleopatra.
- Augustus is played by Rupert Frazer in the 1983 BBC miniseries The Cleopatras.
- Pax Soprana is the sixth episode of the HBO original series The Sopranos, released in 1999. The title is a reference to the Pax Romana, an era of Roman peace ushered in by Augustus, which Tony Soprano hopes to achieve within the Soprano family. Augustus is mentioned by Tony in his conversation with Uncle Junior.
- Augustus is played by Mark Warren and Colin Moy in several episodes of the Xena: Warrior Princess series (2000).
- Augustus is portrayed in the 2003 television film Imperium: Augustus (part of the Imperium movie series) by Peter O'Toole as an old man and Benjamin Sadler as a young man.
- In the HBO/BBC/RAI television series Rome (2005), Octavian is portrayed as a young man by Max Pirkis and as an adult by Simon Woods. In the first season of the series Octavian is a well-read supporter of Caesar. Octavian becomes the pupil of Titus Pullo and also advises Pullo several times. Octavian shifts to more overtly ambitious and Machiavellian in the second season as his growing rivalry with Antony becomes apparent. In contrast to more benign portrayals of Octavian, this portrayal depicts him as fairly cruel with only brief moments of humanity shown in his relationship with his sister. The series ends with Octavian's triumphant return to Rome after his victory over Antony and Cleopatra.
- Augustus is portrayed by Santiago Cabrera in an ABC miniseries called Empire (2005), which takes place after the assassination of Julius Caesar.
- Augustus is played by Mathew Baynton in the 2009–2013 TV series Horrible Histories and also features in the 2015 reboot series of the same name (portrayed by James McNicholas).
- Augustus (Gaius) is played by Tom Glynn-Carney and Matthew McNulty in the TV series Domina (2021).

== Radio ==
- In the BBC Radio 4 series Caesar! (2003-2007), written by Mike Walker, Augustus was played by both Adam Levy and Richard Johnson in the second episode of Series One, called "The Arena".
- Sir Derek Jacobi played Augustus in the 2010 radio adaptation of I, Claudius, having played Claudius in the original 1976 BBC TV adaption.
- Augustus featured in over 100 episodes of the "Life of Caesar" Podcast, by Cameron Reilly and Ray Harris Jr., which ran from 2015 to 2018.

== Military ==
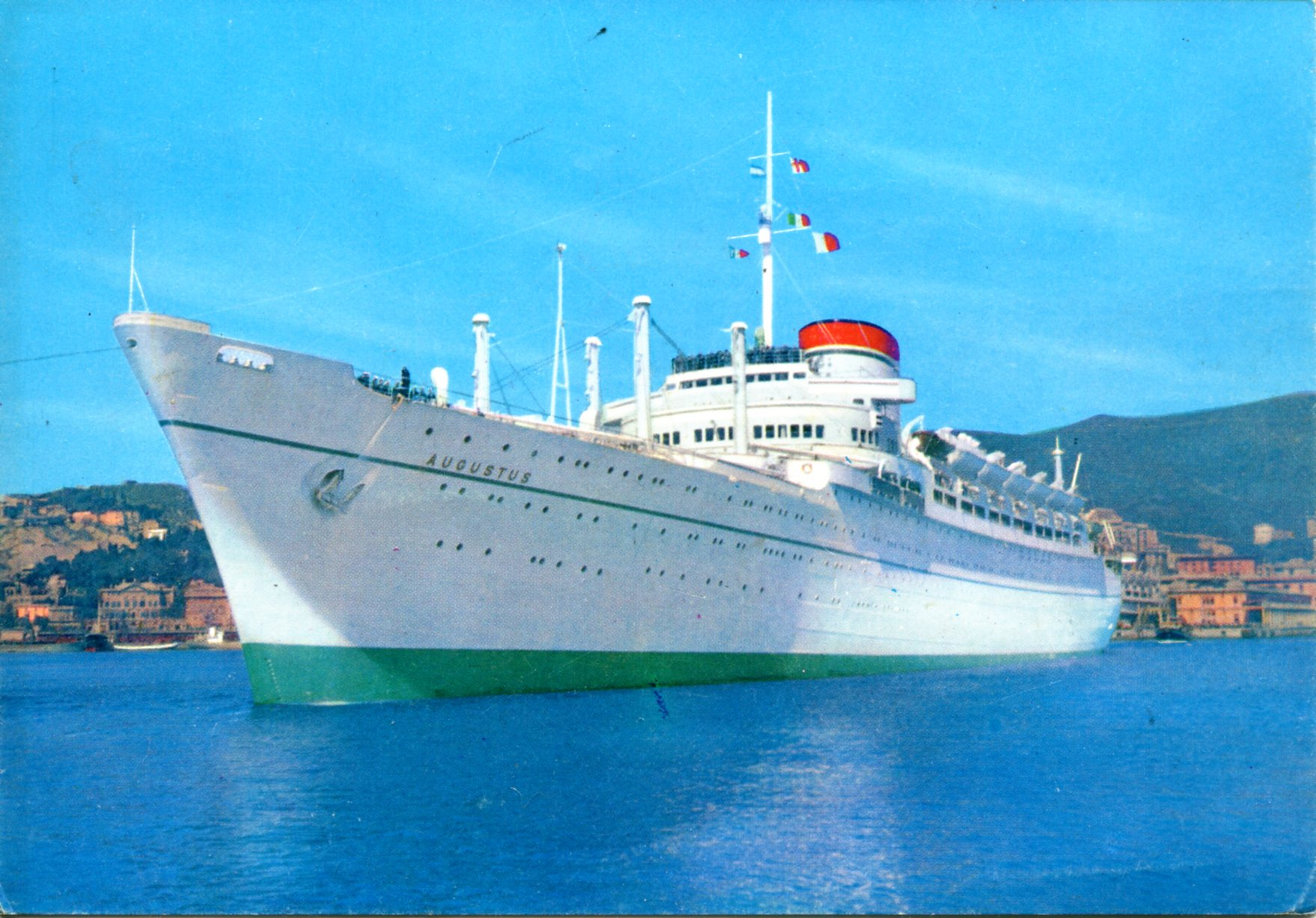
Postcard of the MS Augustus (1950)

- MS Augustus (1926)
- MS Augustus (1950)

== Video games ==
- In Civilization IV, each game concludes with various statistics and a timeline, as well as a scale comparing the player to various historical figures. Augustus Caesar is at the top of the scale. He was also added in the expansion Civilization IV: Warlords as a Roman leader, accompanying Julius Caesar from the original game.
- Augustus also makes his way into Civilization V, once again leading the Roman Empire. His special ability is "The Glory of Rome", which grants production bonuses for city improvements.
- Augustus is a playable leader in Civilization VII.
- Augustus is a Main Character in the PS2 game, Shadow of Rome.
- Augustus is one of the playable factions in Total War: Rome II's "Imperator Augustus" Campaign pack, which depicts the Second Triumvirate War between Octavian, Mark Antony and Lepidus during the last years of the Roman Republic. This DLC was released simultaneously with Total War: Rome II: Emperor Edition.
- Augustus is mentioned as a member of the Order of the Ancients in the game Assassin's Creed Origins and also appears in the comic book series of the same name.

== See also ==
- Gardens of Augustus
