= Equestrian statue of Augustus (Mérida) =

avgvsto
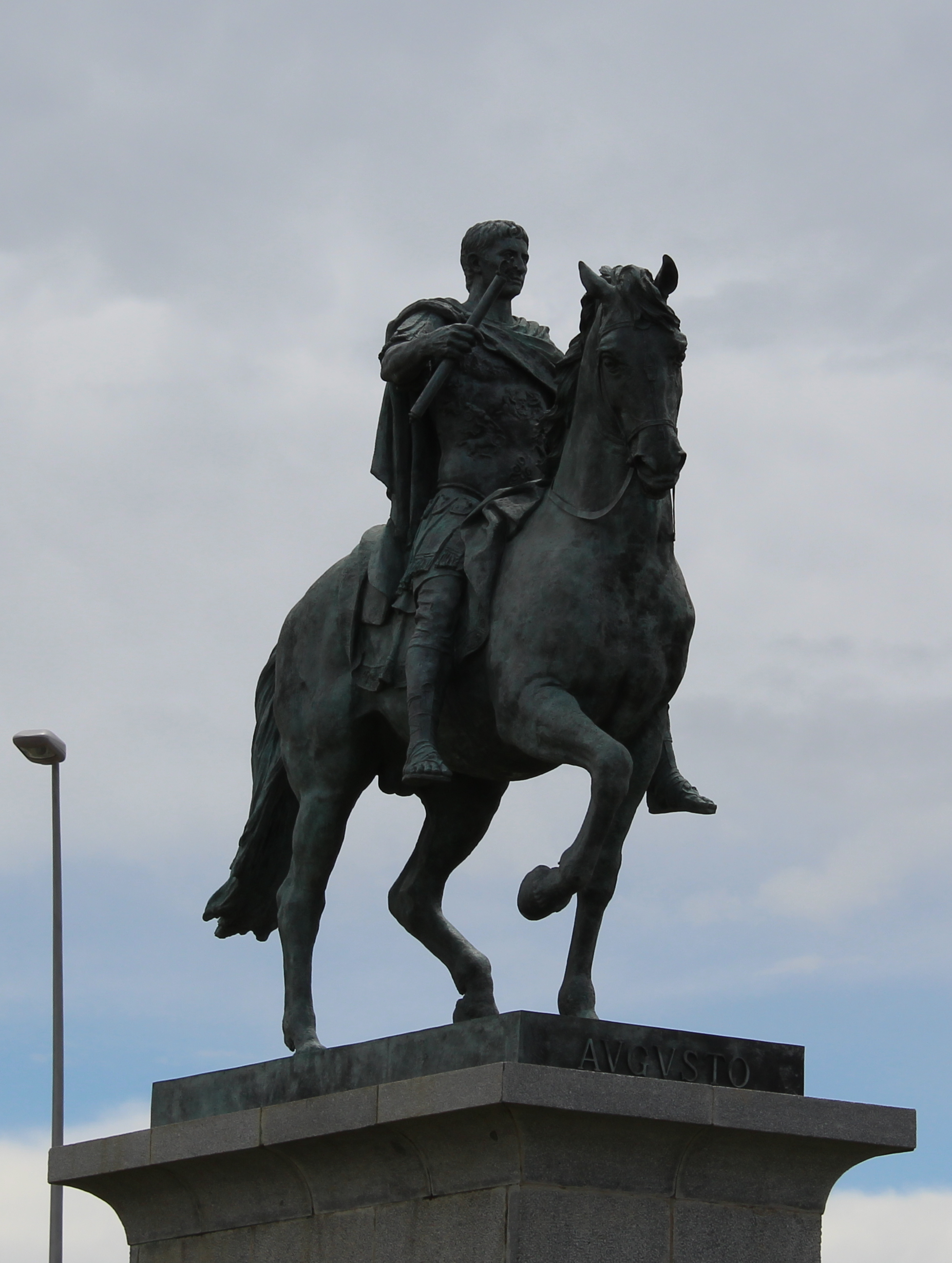
- 38.904871°N 6.364105°W
- Location: Mérida, Spain
- Designer: Eduardo Zancada Pérez
- Material: Bronze, granite
- Height: 3.75 m (statue)
- Weight: 2.5 tonnes (statue)
- Opening date: 25 April 2007
- Dedicated to: Augustus

The equestrian statue of Augustus is a bronze statue of Augustus, the first Roman emperor, riding a horse. It dates from 2007 and is in Mérida, Spain, located on a roundabout at the intersection of the Avenida de Portugal and the Avenida Reina Sofía. Emerita Augusta, today Mérida, was founded as a Roman colony in 25 BC at the order of Augustus to serve as a retreat for the veteran soldiers (emeritus) of the legions V Alaudae and X Gemina.

== History and description ==
The sculpture was initially intended to be erected on the roundabout of Tres Fuentes, yet plans changed along the way. With a budget of 112,780 € in disposal, the municipal managing board awarded the project in September 2005 to Eduardo Zancada, the only artist who had entered the public competition, and himself a son of the mayor of Mérida between 1952 and 1954, Eduardo Zancada Alarcón. There is another sculpture of Augustus in a city's roundabout, near the Lusitania Bridge.

Cast in bronze in Madrid at Codina's foundry, the sculpture weighs 2.5 tonnes. The 3.75 metre high sculpture, features the Roman emperor riding a horse without stirrups, wearing a muscle cuirass, and brandishing a staff while keeping the sword in the belt. It lies on top of a granite plinth.

Shortly before the 2007 municipal elections, the sculpture was inaugurated in April 2007 along the whole reform of the traffic circle, with an inner radius of 7.50 m and an outer radius of 17.50 m, at about the same time that another equestrian statue also by Zancada featuring Augustus' son-in-law Marcus Vipsanius Agrippa.
