= Roman Tragedies =

Roman Tragedies (Dutch: Romeinse Tragedies) is a 6-hour stage adaptation of William Shakespeare's plays Coriolanus, Julius Caesar, and Antony and Cleopatra, created in 2007 by Toneelgroep Amsterdam, the theatre company of Amsterdam. As of November 2012, the company continues to perform it at venues across the world. Directed by Ivo van Hove, the production has been highly praised for its acting, its innovative set, and its use of multimedia.

== Concept ==
Promotional image from the London production, illustrating audience members seating on onstage sofas, and the use of live video of the actors.

Roman Tragedies condenses three of Shakespeare's plays into a single 6-hour production. The actors speak Dutch; surtitles are used when touring the production. The surtitles do not present Shakespeare's original text, but rather a lightly modernized adaptation that removes archaisms; only the most famous lines are left untouched.

Director Ivo van Hove has said that he wanted to use Shakespeare's plays to explore the nature of politicians: "How politicians make good decisions, how they make mistakes, why they make mistakes." He wanted to emphasize the similarity between the issues faced by the Roman leaders and those of modern leaders, saying "it's very easy for us to talk about our times with these characters as, in the 17th century, Shakespeare went back to them to talk about his own times."

The production is in modern dress; the characters are dressed as modern politicians even though the text is not adapted to reflect this. Several male characters, including Cassius and Octavius Caesar, are played as women, in order to reflect the existence today of female politicians such as Angela Merkel and Hillary Clinton. The production features much use of multimedia: camera operators are present on stage throughout, so that the actors are visible both on stage and on multiple TV monitors.

The production features an unusual set that enables members of the audience to sit on stage during the performance, on numerous sofas facing in different directions upon the large performance space. When seated on the stage, the audience member is able to view the actors in person, or via the many TV monitors. There is no intermission, but there are several 5-minute set changes. Also on stage is a bar selling food and drink, and an Internet station, which audience members can use during the set changes.

The set also features a news ticker. This is used to summarize events that have been cut for the adaptation (mostly battle scenes), but audience members are also encouraged to submit their responses to the play online, while watching; these responses are played on the ticker during the set changes.

== Responses ==
Reactions to the production have been very positive. Michael Billington of the British newspaper The Guardian claimed it was "as good as theatre gets". Michael Coveney of the British Independent newspaper wrote that although the style was impressive, the acting was the most important quality: "Many of the techniques were familiar in modern production. But the overall scope of this wonderful project was impressive because of the acting quality of Toneelgroep. It made you want to go straight on to Amsterdam and catch the rest of their repertoire."

== History ==
Roman Tragedies premiered at the Holland Festival in 2007.

The production has toured to several international venues. It has been staged at the Avignon Festival in France and at the Barbican Centre in London, UK. Its North American premiere was the Festival TransAmériques, where it played at Montreal and Quebec City in 2010.
