= Temple of Augustus =

Numerous temples of Augustus, the first Roman emperor, were built in the territories of the Roman Empire. They included the following:

- Temple of Augustus, Pula, Croatia
- Temple of Augustus, Muziris (near Cochin), India
- Temple of Augustus, Caesarea Maritima, Israel
- Temple of Augustus and Livia, Vienne, France
- Temple of Divus Augustus, Nola, Italy
- Temple of Divus Augustus, Rome, Italy
- Temple of Augustus, Barcelona, Spain
- Temple of Augustus, Tarragona, Spain
- Temple of Augustus and Rome, in Ancyra (modern Ankara, Turkey)
