= Virgil reading The Aeneid before Augustus, Livia and Octavia =

1812 painting by Jean-Auguste-Dominique Ingres

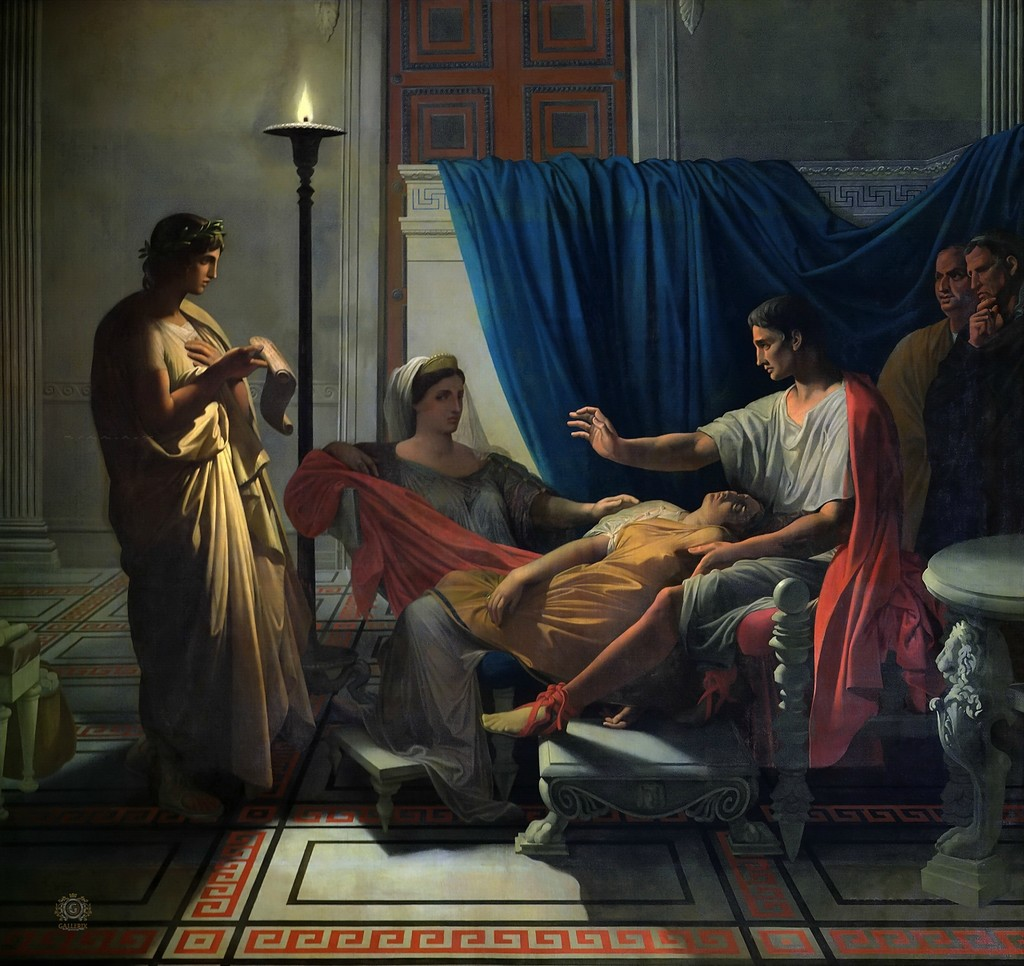
Virgil reading The Aeneid before Augustus, Livia and Octavia (1812, later reworked), Toulouse, Musée des Augustins

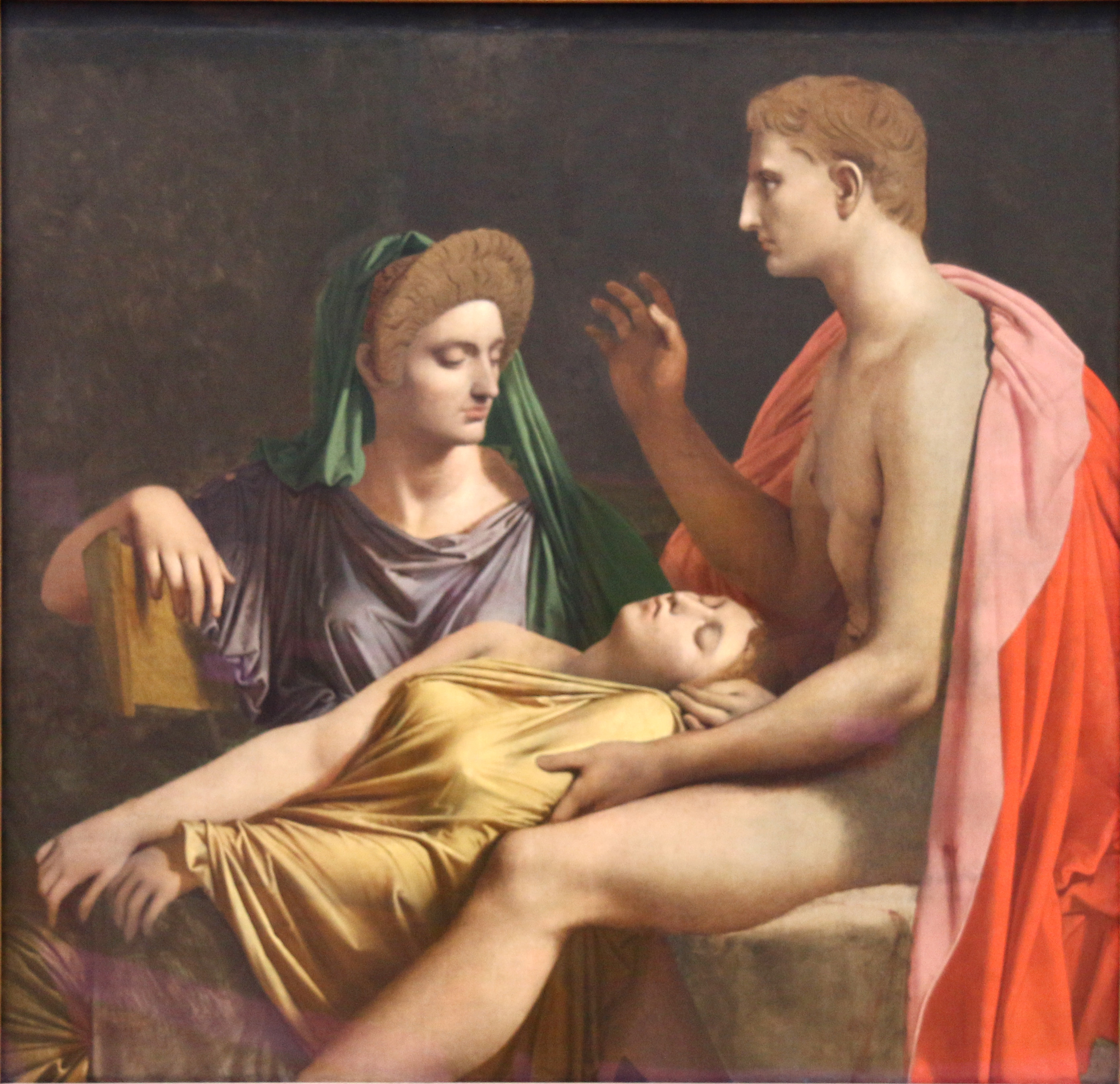
Virgil reading The Aeneid before Augustus, Livia and Octavia (c. 1819), Brussels, Royal Museums of Fine Arts of Belgium

Virgil reading the Aeneid before Augustus, Livia and Octavia, known in French as Tu Marcellus Eris, is an 1812 painting by Jean-Auguste-Dominique Ingres. It is an oil on canvas measuring 304 × 323 cm (120 × 127 in.) and is in the Musée des Augustins in Toulouse. It depicts the moment when Virgil, reciting his work The Aeneid to the Emperor Augustus, his wife Livia and his sister Octavia, mentions the name of Octavia's dead son, Marcellus, causing Octavia to faint. Augustus' advisors, Marcus Agrippa and Gaius Maecenas, can be seen watching in the background. The painting is based on an anecdote, recorded in the late fourth-century vita of Virgil by Aelius Donatus, in which the poet read the passage in Book VI in praise of Octavia's late son Marcellus, and Octavia fainted with grief. This anecdote has also been depicted in works by other artists, including Jean-Joseph Taillasson, Antonio Zucchi, Jean-Baptiste Wicar, Jean-Bruno Gassies and Angelica Kaufmann.

Ingres was commissioned in 1811 by the French governor of Rome, General Miollis, a wealthy patron of the arts, to depict this event for his own residence, the villa Aldobrandini. The painting was delivered the next year. Sometime after 1835, Ingres repurchased it and made extensive modifications to the composition. Ingres's modifications included changes to the architectural setting and the addition of the figures of Agrippa and Gaius Maecenas at the far right. He also added canvas to the top edge to convert the composition to a vertical format, but was dissatisfied with the result and removed the addition. Ingres bequeathed the painting, which remained unfinished at his death in 1867, to the city of Toulouse.

Over the course of 53 years, Ingres revisited this scene from antiquity in over 100 drawings and watercolours and three oil paintings. One of these paintings, a three-figure fragment cut from an abandoned version, is in the Royal Museums of Fine Arts of Belgium in Brussels.

In 1825 he made a chalk drawing in vertical format as a model for a reproductive engraving made by Pradier in 1832. In the drawing and the print, a sculpture of Marcellus stands behind and above the four central figures. In 1865, Ingres painted a third version in oil (Philadelphia, La Salle University Art Museum) by painting over a copy of the Pradier print.

== See also ==
- List of paintings by Jean-Auguste-Dominique Ingres
