= Roman relations with Nubia =

The geographical region of ancient Nubia covers the area from the First Cataract at Aswan in the north, to the Blue and White Niles at Khartoum in the south, and adjacent deserts. The region includes the Nile Valley of Upper Egypt and modern Sudan. The earliest history of Nubia dates to the Paleolithic period, and the civilization of ancient Nubia developed alongside ancient Egypt on the Nile valley. Both Egypt and Nubia are characterized by their distinct cultural identities and had close interactions—military, political, and commercial—throughout history. Prior to Roman contact, the Nubian Kingdom of Kush had trade relations with Ptolemaic Egypt. The early interaction between Rome and of Kush was full of tensions and conflicts before Augustus established a peace treaty with Kush. Nubia thereby flourished for nearly three centuries through trade with Roman Egypt. Archaeological excavations and written accounts by Classical authors such as Strabo, Pliny the Elder, and Diodorus are important sources of information about Roman relations with Nubia.

== 1st century BC – 3rd century CE (Meroitic period) ==
=== Conflicts between Rome and Kush ===
Roman interaction with Nubia started in the late first century BC after Egypt became part of the Roman empire, following the defeat of Mark Antony and Cleopatra at the battle of Actium (31 BC). The chronology falls under the Meroitic period (4th century BC to 4th century CE) of the kingdom of Kush. During the Meroitic period, the city of Meroë, located at Upper Nubia and about 200 km north of Khartoum, was the political, religious, and cultural center of the kingdom. Soon after Egypt fell under Roman rule, C. Cornelius Gallus, the first prefect of Egypt appointed by Augustus, attacked Nubia. The Romans attempted to solidify their authority in Nubia by appointing a local ruler and forcing Kushite officials to pay tribute to Rome. However, the Kushites showed resistance against Roman control, resulting in a series of raids and counter-attacks between the Roman and the Kushite forces (Strabo, Geography 17.1.54). The Kushites attacked several cities and Roman garrisons, and statues of Caesar were pulled down. Led by Publius Petronius, the governor of Egypt, Roman soldiers fought back by capturing several cities, including Pselcis, Primis, Abuncis, Phthuris, Cambusis, Attenia, and Stadissias, and he reached as far as Napata and taking captives. According to Strabo, some captives were sold as booty, one thousand were sent to Caesar, and the others died of diseases (Strabo, Geography 1.17.54).

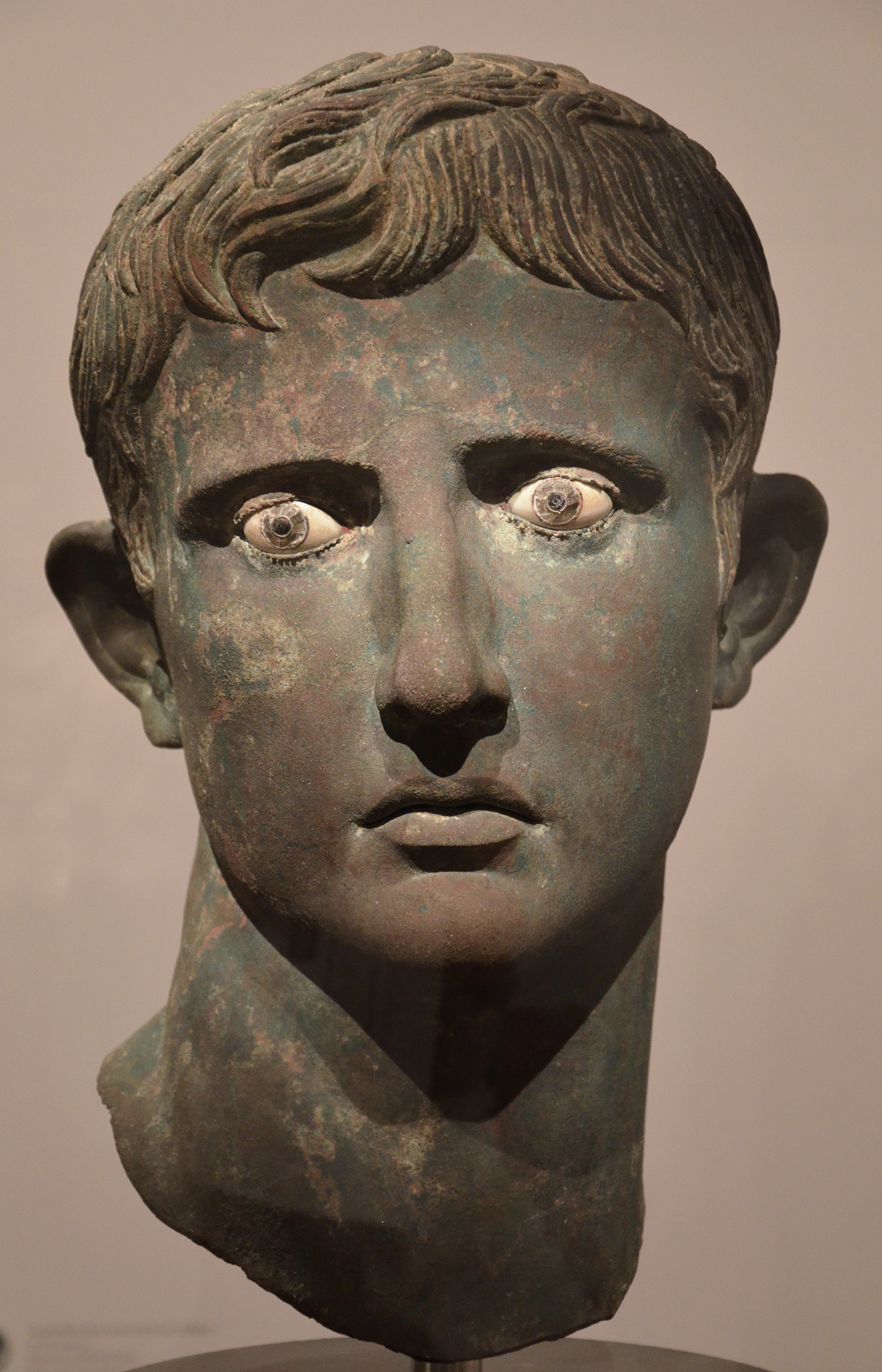
Bronze head from an over-life-sized statue of Augustus, found in the ancient Nubian site of Meroë in Sudan, 27

During the series of conflicts, the Kushites crossed the lower border of Egypt and looted many statues (among other things) from the Egyptian towns near the first Cataract of the Nile at Aswan. One of the pieces of archaeological evidence of these conflicts is the bronze head of Augustus, dated to c. 27–25 BC, now at the British Museum. This bronze head belongs to an over-life-size statue of Augustus, originally standing in one of the Egyptian towns near the first cataract of the Nile, the area under Roman control at that time. The Kushite army invaded that region and looted many of the similar statues of Augustus in 24 BC. Although the Roman army was able to seize back some of the statues at the counter-attacks, they did not reach Meroe and thus were not able to reclaim this bronze head. The bronze head of Augustus was found buried beneath a local temple dedicated to Nike. It has been suggested that the bronze head was likely to be placed at the feet of Meroitic captors as a mark of the resilience of the Kushites against the Romans.

Strabo mentions a Kushite queen (also known as Candace) and describes her as a masculine sort of woman with one eye blind, who played an important role in the Roman-Kushite encounters and negotiating with the Romans (Geography 17.54.1). In fact, 'Candace' is only the Kushite title for queen, and her name is Amanirenas. She was residing at Napata with her son. Although she sent ambassadors to the Romans and offered to give back the captives and statues bought from Syene, Petronius attacked and captured Napata too. She and her son both fled from the city. Petronius set up a garrison at Premnis to fortify the city, and then set out for Alexandria. Amanirenas then marched against the garrison with soldiers, forcing Petronius to return and confront the Kushites.

=== Peace between Rome and Kush ===
Peace was finally restored when emperor Augustus met with Kushite ambassadors and granted them all they pled for, and ‘he even remitted the tributes which he had imposed’ (Strabo, Geography 17.1.54). This was followed by almost three hundred years of peace between Rome and Kush, as Kush flourished through trade with Roman Egypt from the first century BC to the early third century CE. Imported goods from Roman Egypt include various kinds of luxury goods, such as precious metal, glass, jewelry, beads, as well as household furnishings. Trade with Nubia supplied Rome with African slaves, ivory, and other exotic products.

It was recorded by Seneca the Younger and Pliny the Elder that Nero planned on attacking Nubia, and he sent out a party of praetorian troops to explore the region. The explorers reported back to the emperor that there was nothing but desert (Pliny, Natural History 6.181; Seneca, Natural Questions 6.8.3).

Roman authors from the following period were interested in Nubia, its geography and ethnography in northeast Africa (for example, see Pliny, Natural History 6.181-195).

== 3rd century CE – 6th century CE (post-Meroitic period) ==
=== Conflicts between the Nobadians, Blemmyes, and Rome ===
The kingdom of Kush fell in late antiquity due to attack from the Nobadians and Blemmyes, and the Roman frontier to the south of the First Cataract was under threats, which led to the abandonment of the region under Diocletian. Both Nodabians and Blemmyes were two of the nomadic tribes that lived between Egypt and Meröe. They were described by Roman authors as hostile nomads (see Strabo, Geography 17.1. 53). Earlier in the first and early second centuries, these nomadic groups were probably kept under control by the Kushites under the Meroitic kingdom, and they hardly put any threats to Roman Egypt. It was also possible that the Romans maintained a peaceful relationship with them. Roman authors ascribed an uncivilized nature to the Blemmyes. Both Pliny the Elder and Pomponius Mela associated the Blemmyes with mythical figures such as satyrs and "Goat-Pans" (Pomponii Melae de Chorographia 1.23; Pliny, Natural History 5.44). Pliny even described them as headless monsters, ‘their mouth and eyes being attached to their chests’ (Natural History 5.46).

Our knowledge of the relations between Blemmyes and the Romans was based on written sources in Greek and Latin, and the historical accuracy of these sources remains uncertain. According to the anonymous ‘Chronicon Paschale,’ the only source to records the event, the first Blemmy raid into Egypt happened during the reign of Decius, c. 249-251 CE; the same source reports that Decius brought poisonous snakes and lions and released them at the Egyptian frontiers to attack the Nobadians and Blemmyes (Chronicon Paschale, CSHB I 1832, 504 f). Blemmy invaded again during the reign of Aurelian, c. 270-275 CE. They probably participated in the Palmyrene invasion and brief occupation of Egypt. The revolt was suppressed by Emperor Aurelian, and Blemmyes were allegedly included in the list of captives in the emperor's triumphal procession (Historia Augusta, Vita Aur 33.4). The account's accuracy is doubtful. According to Historia Augusta, the Blemmyes attacked and occupied the cities of Coptos and Ptolemais in Upper Egypt under the reign of Probus (276-281), but they were later defeated and, again, taken as captives and exhibited at the emperor's triumph (Historia Augusta, Vita Probi 17.2-3).

=== Roman withdrawal from Kush ===
The series of raids and conflicts at the southern frontier of Egypt that took place in the late third century CE resulted in Roman withdrawal (298 CE) from Nubia under Diocletian, and a new border was established at the First Cataract. Details of this event were recorded by Procopius, writing two centuries after the events, and scholars believe that his account of the geographical locations of the settlements of Blemmyes and Nobadians was probably more akin to his own period than in the third century CE (Procopius, Histories 1.19.28-35).

=== Axum and the Byzantine Empire ===
In the third century CE, Rome withdrew its forces from Egypt, making way for the expanding Kingdom of Aksum, whose territory included most of present-day Ethiopia and Yemen, to fill the power vacuum. Nubia continued to be a contested region. The first Roman attestation of Axum is the periplus of Euthymenes, which notes Axum's location on the trade route between the Red Sea and northeast Africa. The Christian Topography, a book written by Cosmas Indicopleustes in the sixth century CE, recorded an inscription commemorating the founding of the kingdom of Axum by a pagan king in the second or third century CE. Burstein suggests that the success of both the kingdoms of Kush and Axum was due to their ability to maintain control of the pastoral nomads between the Nile and the Red Sea. Axumite king Ezana converted to Christianity in the mid-fourth century CE. He attacked the Noba and the Kushite territories, and Meroe was taken over by Axum in the mid-fourth century.

The interaction between Rome and Kush continued. In 530/31 CE, Emperor Justinian I of the Byzantine Empire sent an ambassador Magistrianos Julian down the Nile to see Arethas, the king of Axum, to ask for his assistance in a war against Dhu Nuwas, the Himyarite King of Yemen (517–530 CE). Arethas accepted the campaign.

== See also ==
- Meroe
- Blemmyes
- History of Sudan
- Roman Egypt
- Gaius Petronius

== Bibliography ==
- Burstein, Stanley Mayer. 1998. Ancient African Civilizations: Kush and Axum. Princeton, NJ: Markus Wiener.
- Burstein, Stanley M. 1993. “The Hellenistic Fringe: The Case of Meroë.” In Hellenistic History and Culture, edited by Peter Green, 38–66. Berkeley: University of California Press.
- Burstein, Stanley M. 2021. “Greek and Roman Views of Ancient Nubia.” In The Oxford Handbook of Ancient Nubia, edited by Geoff Emberling and Bruce Beyer Williams, 697–711. Oxford University Press. https://doi.org/10.1093/oxfordhb/9780190496272.013.32.
- Emberling, Geoff, and Bruce Beyer Williams, eds. 2021. The Oxford Handbook of Ancient Nubia. Oxford University Press. https://doi.org/10.1093/oxfordhb/9780190496272.001.0001.
- Grzymski, Krzysztof. 2021. “The City of Meroe.” In The Oxford Handbook of Ancient Nubia, edited by Geoff Emberling and Bruce Beyer Williams, 0. Oxford University Press. https://doi.org/10.1093/oxfordhb/9780190496272.013.26.
- Updegraff, Robert T. 1988. “The Blemmyes I: The Rise of the Blemmyes and the Roman Withdrawal from Nubia under Diocletian.” In Band 10/1. Halbband Politische Geschichte (Provinzen Und Randvölker: Afrika Und Ägypten), edited by Hildegard Temporini, 44–106. De Gruyter. https://doi.org/10.1515/9783110852943-003.
- Williams, Bruce Beyer, and Geoff Emberling. 2021. “Nubia, a Brief Introduction.” In The Oxford Handbook of Ancient Nubia, edited by Geoff Emberling and Bruce Beyer Williams. Oxford University Press. https://doi.org/10.1093/oxfordhb/9780190496272.013.1.
