= Hamadab Stela =

Sandstone stela found in Sudan

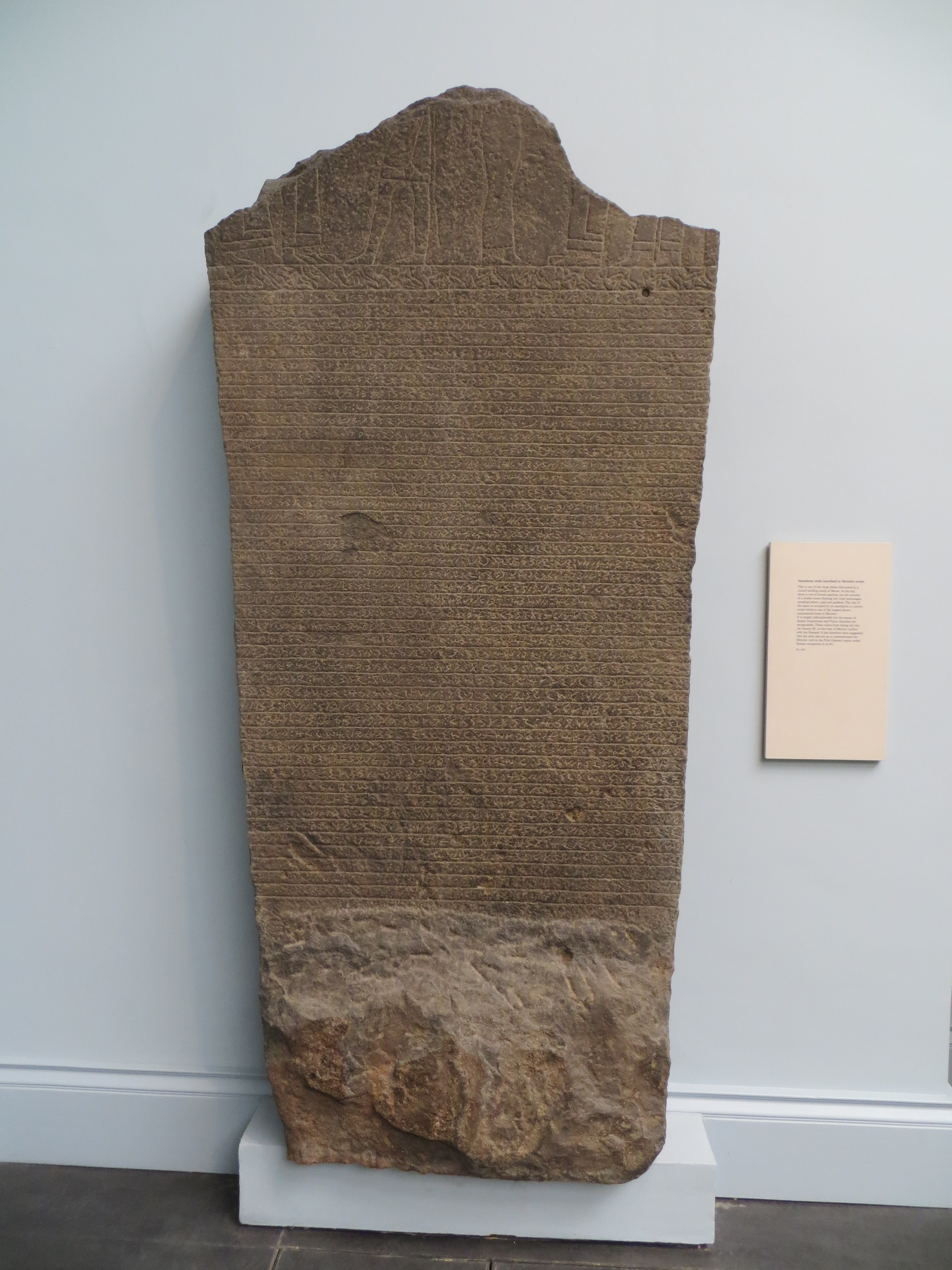
- Hamadab Stela
- Material: Sandstone
- Size: 236.5 cm high, 101.5 cm wide
- Writing: Meroitic
- Created: 24 BC
- Discovered: 1914
- Present location: British Museum, London
- Registration: EA1650

The Hamadab Stela is a colossal sandstone stela found at Hamadab just south of the ancient site of Meroë in Sudan. Now kept at the British Museum, the significance of the stela resides in the fact that it is inscribed with one of the longest known texts in the Meroitic script.

== Discovery ==
The stela was found by the British archaeologist John Garstang in 1914 at the site of Hamadab, which is located a few kilometres south of Meroë, the capital of the ancient Kingdom of Kush. One of a pair, the excavators discovered the stelae on either side of the main doorway into a small temple. As part of the division of finds, the stela to the left of the doorway was given to the British Museum, while the other was left in situ.

== Description ==
The stela is in good condition, although part of the top is missing. The upper part includes a frieze showing the Kushite rulers Queen Amanirenas and Prince Akinidad facing various Egyptian deities including Amun and Mut. Below this royal scene is a relief depicting bound prisoners. A 42-line inscription in Meroitic cursive script is engraved beneath this.

== Meroitic script ==
Meroitic was the principal language of the Kingdom of Kush. Poorly understood by modern scholars, it remains untranslatable, although most letters of the Meroitic alphabet are now known (even though the meaning of most words remain obscure). In this inscription, the names of the two monarchs Amanirenas and Akinidad are clearly discernible. It has been proposed that the Hamabad Stela may commemorate a Kushite raid on Roman Egypt in 24 BC. One outcome of these raids could have been the looting of the Meroë Head from a city in Lower Egypt.

== Gallery ==
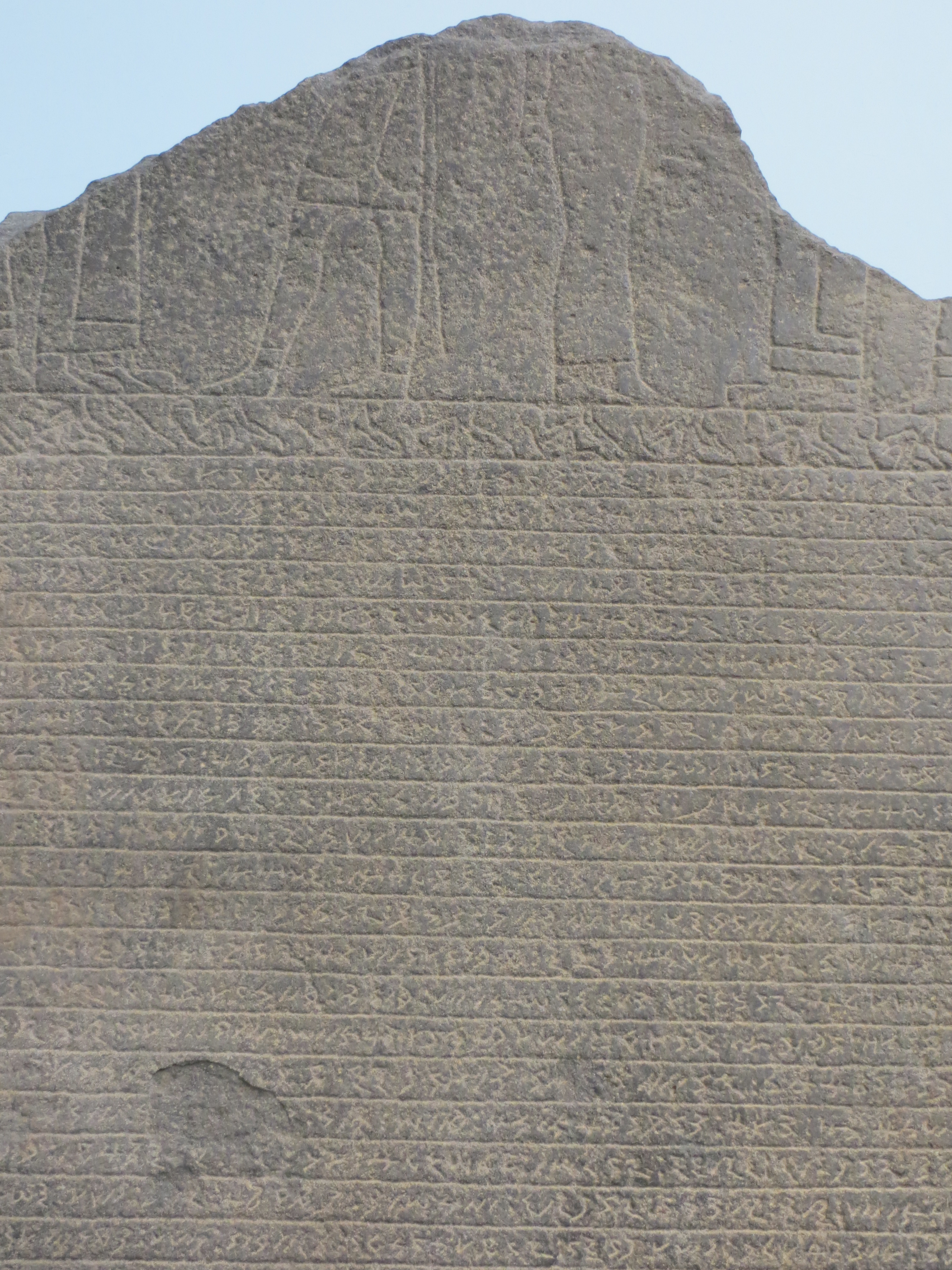
Detail of inscription
