= Hamadab =

Archaeological site

Coordinates: 16.911667°N 33.691944°E

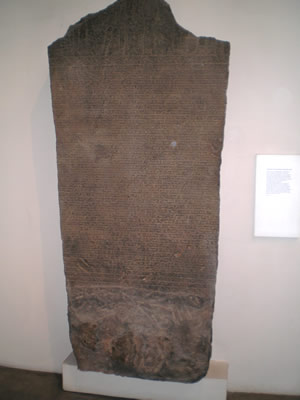
The Hamadab Stela in Meriotic script, one of a pair found at Hamadab (British Museum).

Hamadab is a ruined Kushite city located in central Sudan. It was founded around the 3rd century BC and remained inhabited until the 4th century AD. The name is borrowed from the nearby village of al Dumat Hamadab, as the ancient name of the city is unknown. The ruins lie about 3 kilometres (1.9 mi) south of Meroë. They consist of two hills, 200 by 250 metres (660 ft × 820 ft) in width and length, one being 500 metres (1,600 ft) in height, and the other being half of that. The two hills are separated from each other within the Nile.

In the medieval period habitation shifted south of the old town. This small settlement featured a square building that may have served as a church.

In 1914, a temple was excavated northeast of the settlement; it included pillars dedicated to Queen Amanirenas and her son, Akinidad. While Amun is suspected, it is unknown which god was worshiped in the temple. Other excavations have occurred since 2001. They revealed mud brick built houses surrounded by a wall.
