= Teriteqas =

Nubian King

Kushite King of Meroë
- Reign: Late 1st century BCE
- Predecessor: Naqyrinsan
- Successor: Amanirenas
- Consort: Amanirenas
- Children: Akinidad
- Burial: Pyramid at Meroë (Beg. N 20?)

Teriteqas was a king of Kush, known so far from two Meroitic inscriptions.

He is mentioned in a graffito in the Temple of Dakka and on a stele from Meroë. In both inscriptions he is mentioned together with Queen Amanirenas, who probably ruled alone after him. In both inscriptions, which are not yet fully understood, a prince or king Akinidad also appears.

The location of the inscription in Dakka may provide an indication of the dating of Teriteqas, as this place was not normally part of the Nubian domain. However, this was just before 29 BC. The fall and shortly after 25 BC, when this area was under Nubian rule. Teriteqas therefore dates with relative certainty to the decades before the turn of the century.
