= Meroë Head =

27–25 BC bronze statue of Roman Emperor Augustus

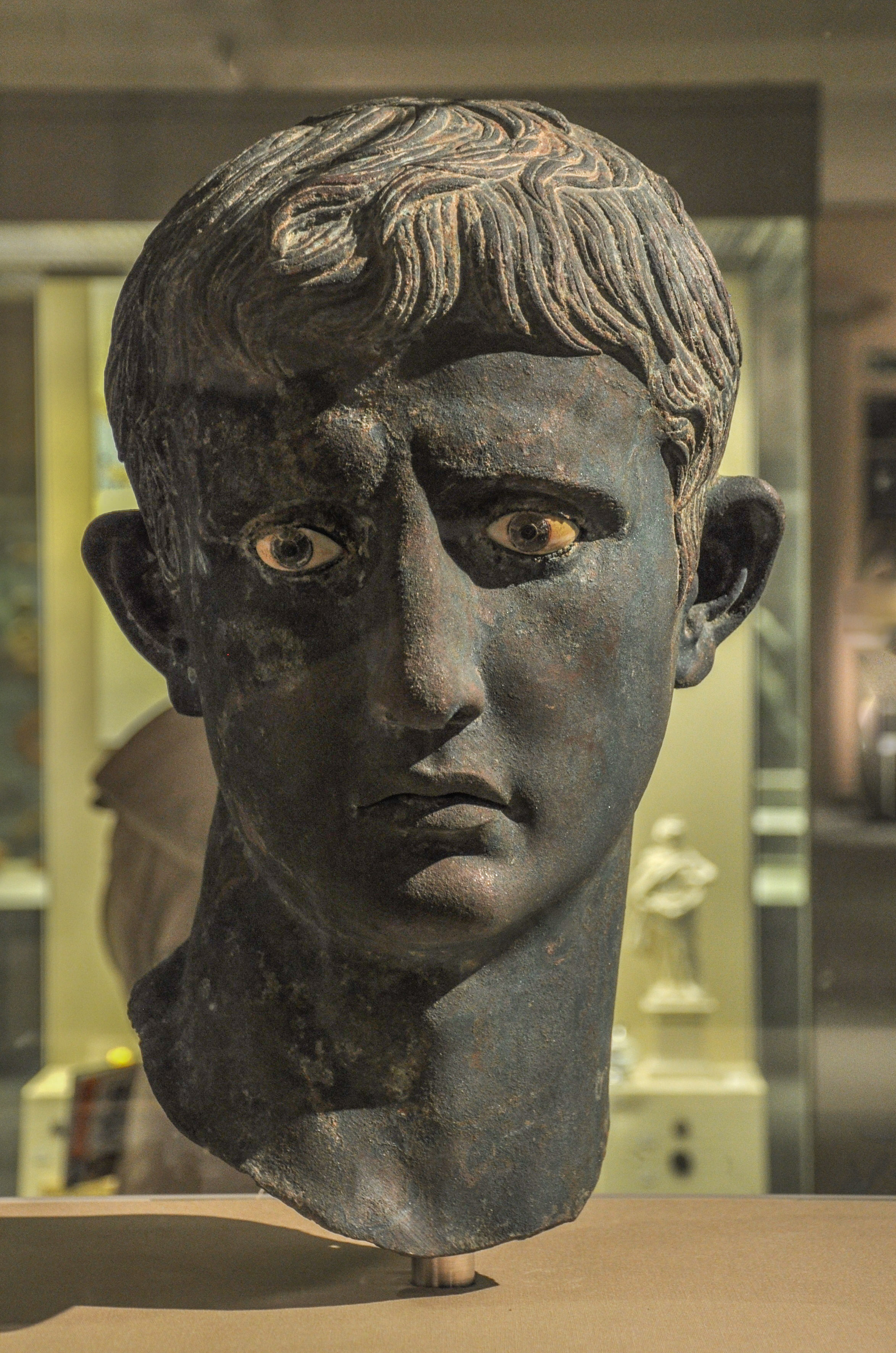
- The bronze head of Augustus from Meroë on display in the British Museum
- Material: Bronze
- Size: 46.2 cm high
- Created: 27–25 BC
- Present location: British Museum, London
- Identification: 1911,0901.1

The Meroë Head, or Head of Augustus from Meroë, is a larger-than-life-size bronze head depicting the first Roman emperor, Augustus, that was found in the ancient Nubian site of Meroë in modern Sudan in 1910. Long admired for its striking appearance and perfect proportions, it is now part of the British Museum's collection. It was looted from Roman Egypt in 24 BC by the forces of queen Amanirenas of Kush and brought back to Meroë, where it was buried beneath the staircase of a temple.

== Discovery and excavation ==
The head was excavated by the British archaeologist John Garstang in December 1910 at Meroë, which had been the capital of the Kingdom of Kush for several centuries. It was found near a mound (M292) under what was once a temple staircase. The statue had been purposely buried over 1900 years prior and had been well preserved due to the hot, dry conditions. His excavation report states, “Just outside the doorway of this chamber, and buried in a clean pocket of sand [two and a half meters from the surface] there was a Roman bronze portrait head of heroic size.” Garstang was eager to share his findings with the world, so he shipped it off to London as soon as possible. The bust was donated to the British Museum by the Sudan Excavation Committee with the support of the National Art Collections Fund in 1911.

The excavation covered the entire lost city of Meroë. It took two excavations of the area to come across the head. Among other structures, the excavation team uncovered the ruins of a temple of Ammon, the ornately decorated temple in which the head was buried, and two large buildings speculated to be palaces.

This large undertaking was financed by the Sudan Excavation Committee, composed of the National Museum of Scotland, the Ny Carlsberg Glyptotek, and the Royal Museums of Fine Arts of Belgium. According to Thorston Opper's The Meroë Head of Augustus (Objects in Focus), the "committee was an international consortium of museum professionals, academics, and wealthy individuals, united by a desire to partake in the thrill of archaeological adventure and a share in the prospective finds". However, most of the excavation's sponsorship came from a wealthy group of Britons (including pharmaceutics entrepreneur Henry Solomon Wellcome) and one avid German collector and scholar, Baron von Bissingen.

== Identification ==
=== Initial reactions ===
As soon as the excavators unearthed the head, they immediately knew of its classical Roman origin and speculated that it was from the time of Augustus. Garstang was a specialist in Middle Eastern and Egyptian art, so he conferred with colleagues in Liverpool via post, and erroneously concluded that it depicted Germanicus, Augustus's great-nephew.

=== Professor Studniczka ===
The head was first offered for publication to the expert German Professor Franz Studniczka. He, along with the curators at the British Museum in London, proposed that the head portrayed Augustus himself. When compared with the Augustus of Prima Porta, there was no doubt it was Augustus's head depicted by the portrait.

== Origins ==
=== Kushite raids ===
The head had clearly been hacked off a large statue made in honour of the Roman Emperor Augustus. The Greek historian Strabo mentions in his chronicles that numerous towns in Lower Egypt were adorned with statues of Augustus before an invading Kushite army looted many of them in 24 BC, when Roman forces were away fighting in the Arabian campaign. Romans used statues to remind the empire's largely illiterate population of the emperor's power. Although the Roman military under Petronius successfully invaded Kushite territory and reclaimed many statues, they were unable to reach as far south as the Kushite capital itself. The sculpture was buried beneath a monumental stairway that led to an altar of victory. The placing of the Emperor's head below the shrine's steps was designed to symbolically denigrate the reputation of Augustus in the eyes of the Meroitic aristocracy and Kushite queen Amanirenas.

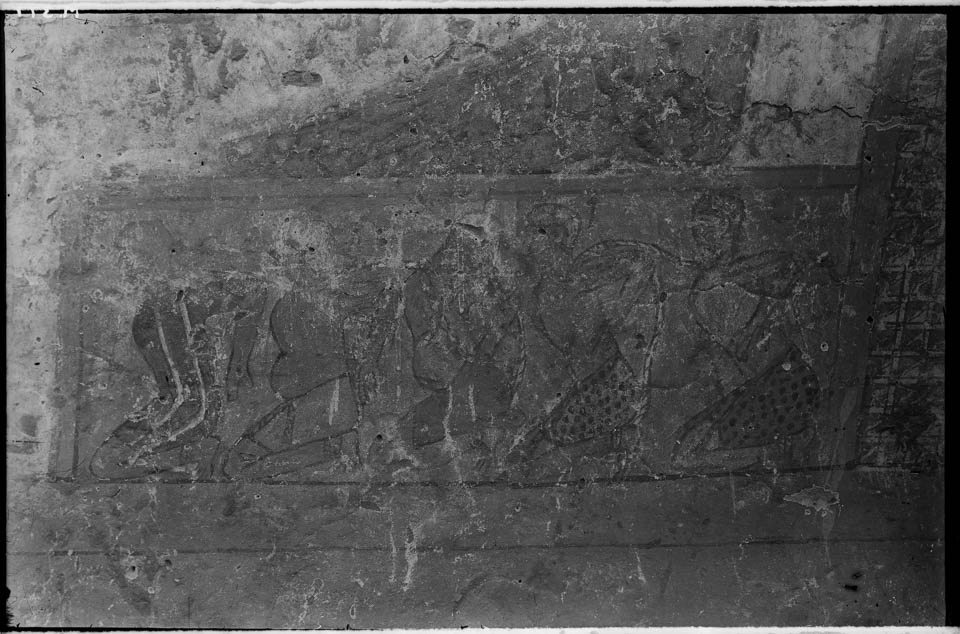
Detail of the painted fresco of the footstool; amongst more traditional enemies is a bound captive (on the far left) who wears a brightly coloured Roman-style tunic and possibly a Roman helmet.

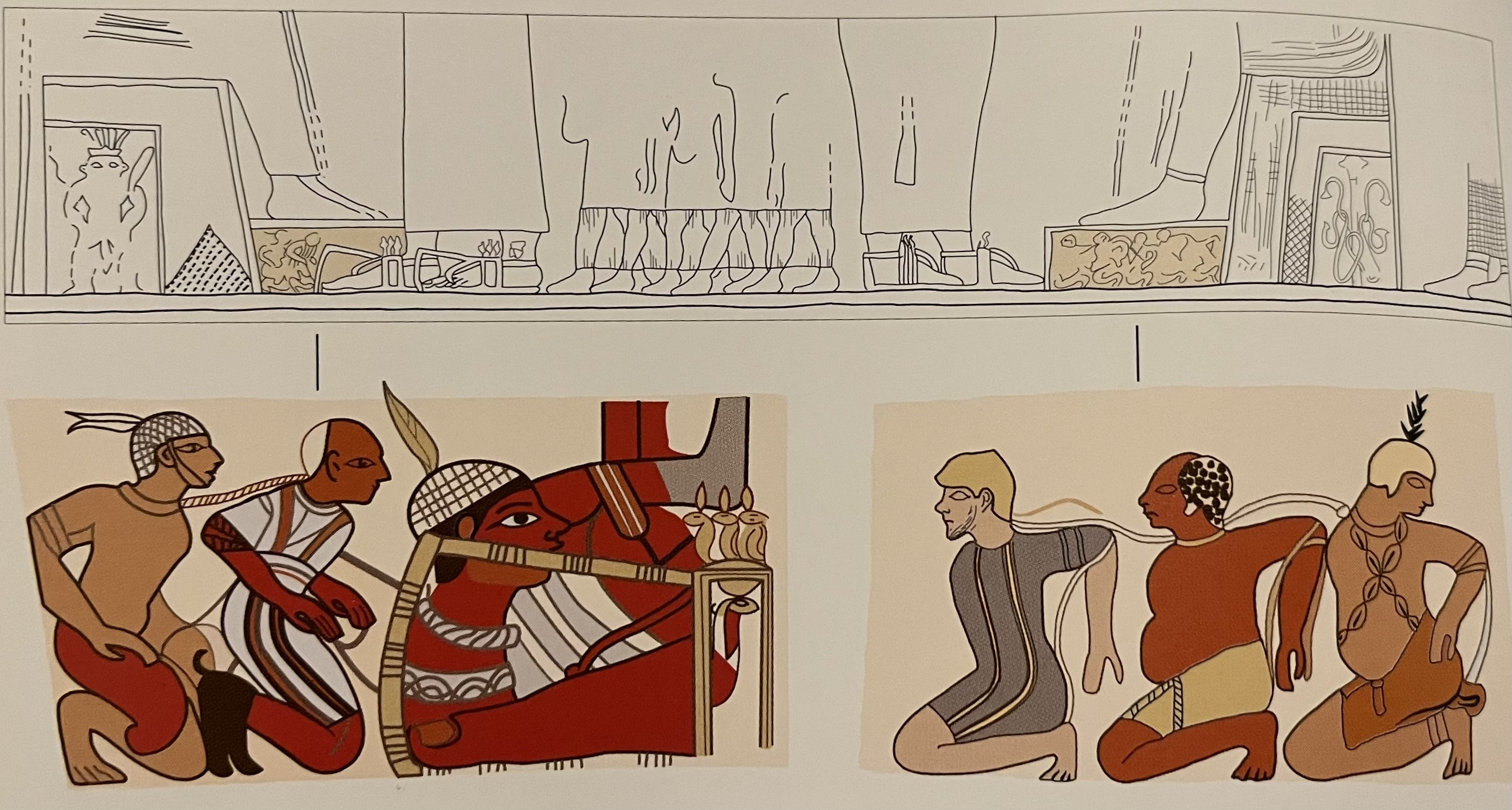
Scene reconstructed based on Shliephack’s watercolour drawings. Above: wall painting inside temple M292; Below: details of bound captives

The wall paintings of temple M292 may support this hypothesis. Although the frescoes of temple M292 now are faded completely, the scene can be reconstructed based on Garstang’s German assistant Shliephack’s series of watercolour drawings. On the east wall were two enthroned figures, of which the footstool depicted with a number of bound prisoners of foreign race. This may indicate that this building used to serve as a victory shrine. The earliest evidence of a foot graffiti proves that the Meroitic temple served throughout history as a pilgrimage centre. The fact that these temples attract visitors indicates that everyone who enters the temple is welcome to step on Augustus's head buried under the doorstep, symbolising Meroë's triumph over the emperor.

=== Other theories ===
There are several other theories regarding the origins of the Meroë Head. One suggested scenario states that the statue from which the head originates was given to the Meroites as a gift from Gallus. This, however, is quite unlikely because Gallus was more keen to place portraiture of himself in Egypt rather than that of Augustus. A second scenario states that the head once belonged to a statue located in the Roman fort, Qasr Ibrim. A specific podium in the fort has been pointed out as the potential spot where the statue once stood. This theory has since been disproved due to radio carbon dating and architectural grounds suggesting the podium is from the Ptolemaic period.

== Design ==
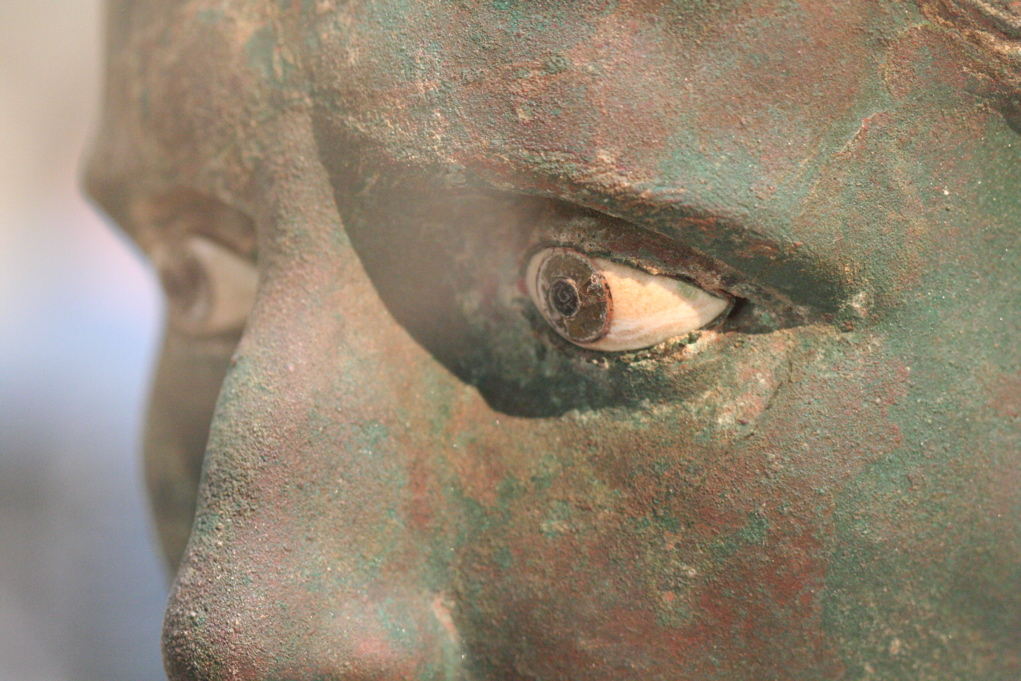
The portrait's striking eyes

The Meroë Head is larger than life-size and mimics Greek art by portraying Augustus with classical proportions; it was clearly designed to idealise and flatter the Emperor. This was the case for most Augustan portraiture, especially the earliest, which evoked both youthfulness and the long-admired Grecian techniques of depicting young men. Made of bronze, the eyes are inset with glass pupils and calcite irises. It is the preservation of the eyes (which are frequently lost in ancient bronze statues) which makes this statue so startlingly realistic. The emperor's head turns to his right and gazes powerfully into the distance. His hair falls onto his brow in waves that are typical of Augustus's portraits. The three locks of hair consisting of two parted at the centre and a third on the right approximate those of the Prima Porta type. The British Museum has several other notable bronze heads of Roman Emperors including an image of Claudius. The heads are thought to have been made locally but based on moulds created in Rome.

== BBC series ==
The Meroë Head was the 35th object in A History of the World in 100 Objects, a BBC Radio 4 series first broadcast in 2010, which traces the story of human civilisation through 100 iconic objects chosen from the collection of the British Museum.

== See also ==
- Cultural depictions of Augustus
- Blacas Cameo
- Roman portraiture

Preceded by 34: Han lacquer cup	A History of the World in 100 Objects; Object 35	Succeeded by 36: The Warren Cup
