= Amanirenas =

Queen of the Meroitic Kingdom of Kush

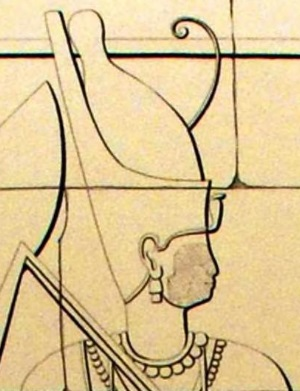
- A portrait of the Kushite queen regnant buried in pyramid Bar. 4, possibly Amanirenas

Kushite Queen of Meroë
- Reign: c. 40-10 BCE
- Predecessor: Teriteqas
- Successor: Amanishakheto
- Consort: Teriteqas
- Children: Akinidad
- Born: c. 60-50 BCE
- Died: c. 10 BCE
- Burial: Jebel Barkal (Bar. 4?)

Amanirenas (also spelled Amanirena), was queen regnant of the Kingdom of Kush from mid to late 1st century BCE. She is known for invading Roman occupied Egypt and successfully negotiating with Roman emperor Augustus the end of Roman retaliation, thus retaining Kushite independence.

Her full title was Amnirense qore li kdwe li ("Ameniras, qore and kandake"). Meroitic, the indigenous language of the kingdom of Kush, remains undeciphered; however, inscriptions giving Queen Amanirenas the title of "qore" as well as "kandake" suggest that she was an individually ruling queen.

== Biography ==
Queen Amanirenas is one of the most famous Meroitic queens because of her role in leading the Kushite army against the Romans in a war that lasted three years (25 BC to 22 BC). This war is largely responsible for halting Rome's southward expansion in Africa. After an initial victory against Roman Egypt, the Kushite army was driven from the country by Prefect Gaius Petronius, who established a new Roman frontier at Hiere Sycaminos (Maharraqa).

Strabo's account of the Meroitic War led against the Roman Empire includes a queen named Kandakê (Κανδάκη, usually Latinized as Candace). Her name appears on stelae alongside those of Teriteqas and Akinidad, but the precise relationship between these three is not entirely clear in the historical record; however, scholars generally consider Akinidad to be her son and Teriteqas to be her husband, with kandake being her title.

== Strabo's Account (17.53-54) ==
=== Kushite Invasion of Egypt ===
She was described by Strabo as being blind in one eye.

According to Strabo's account, the Kushite forces launched an attack on Thebais and Syene while then-prefect Aelius Gallus was away on his ill-fated expedition to Arabia in 25 BC. They were successful in taking Syene, Elephantine, and Philae. As they took the city, they enslaved inhabitants and destroyed the statues of Caesar Augustus. Though Strabo does not mention it specifically, the head of one such statue was buried beneath the steps of a temple, resulting in its unique preservation. The bust remained intact throughout the centuries and is now displayed at the British Museum.

=== Petronius' Nubian Campaign ===
Strabo claims Gaius Petronius, the new prefect of Egypt, marched with "less than ten thousand infantry and eight hundred cavalry" against thirty thousand Kushite men in Syene. The Kushites fought with “large, oblong shields made of raw ox-hide” and simple weaponry such as axes, pikes, and swords. Because of this, they were overwhelmed by Petronius' attack. Strabo describes the Kushite forces as "badly marshaled."

The Kushite forces stated their invasion was due to an issue with the nomarchs, the provincial governors of Egypt; Strabo does not provide information on what the issue was. After Petronius' victory, the Kushite army fled in various directions: some into the cities, some into the desert, and others onto a nearby island.

Strabo ascertains that "among these fugitives were the generals of Queen Candace", queen of the Ethiopians. He describes her as "a masculine sort of woman, and blind in one eye." Strabo is almost certainly referring to Amanirenas, who bore the title of kandake; "Candace" is a Latinization of her title and does not refer to a separate ruler. After capturing the fleeing forces, Petronius sent them to Alexandria to await judgment.

Amanirenas herself resided at Napata with her son. As Petronius approached, taking Pselchis and Premnis along the way, Amanirenas dispatched envoys and the message that she would return both the captives taken in Syene and the statues of Caesar. Her entreaty was ignored and the city was razed. Of the surviving captives he took, some were sold and others sent to Augustus as prisoners of war.

In response, Amanirenas led a second attack against the forces of Petronius left behind at Premnis. Strabo states she had “many thousands of men.” Petronius outmaneuvered Amanirenas and arrived at Premnis first, securing it against her attack. Amanirenas sent ambassadors, which Petronius had escorted to Augustus in Samos on his way to Syria. Augustus imposed no further tributes and fulfilled the ambassadors' wishes.

=== Ensuing Peace Treaty ===
After the success of Petronius's Nubian campaign, the Roman Empire’s southern border moved beyond Egypt to Primis (Qasr Ibrim). The resulting peace treaty saw part of the Thirty-Mile Strip, including Primis, evacuated by the Romans. The Meroites were exempt from paying tribute to the Empire. The treaty allowed the Romans to continue to occupy the Dodekashoinos ("Twelve Shoenoi Land") as a military border zone. The Roman frontier was then moved near Hiere Sycaminos (Maharraqa).

This treaty remained active until the end of the third century AD, with relations between the Kushites and Roman Egypt remaining generally peaceful during this time. The kingdom of Kush remained a formidable power until its decline during the second century CE.

== Meroë Head ==
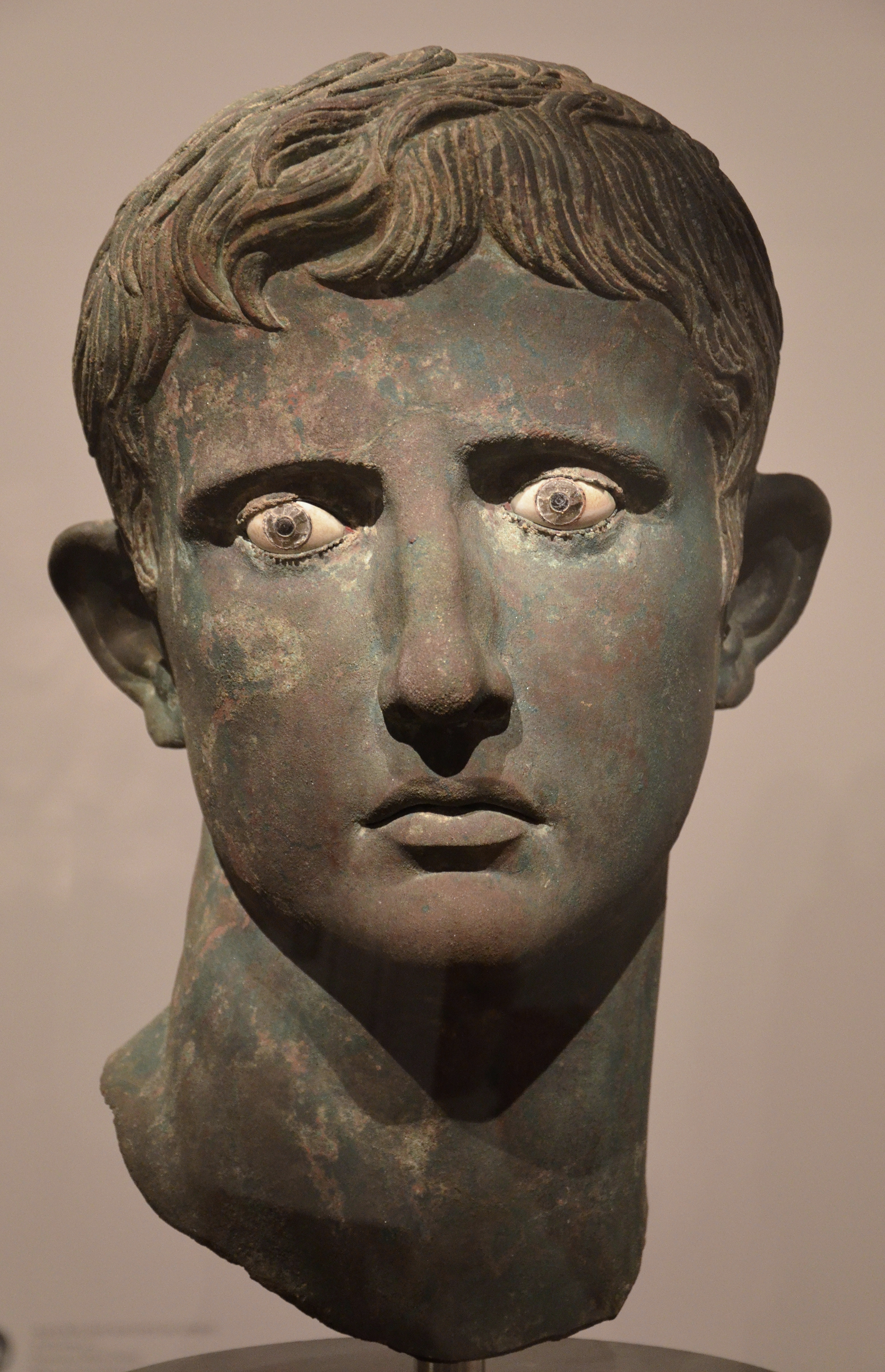
The Meroë Head of Augustus

The head of Augustus preserved by Amanirenas, referred to as the Meroë Head, was discovered by British archaeologist John Garstang in 1910. The glass, metal, and crystal eyes of the statue, which are frequently lost in similar pieces, remained intact due to its burial. The portrait is done in the Greek style, evoking youth and power. The head itself is made of bronze, larger-than-life, and similar in style to the Augustus Prima Porta. The eyes are made of calcite, metal rings, and glass.

The head was buried beneath the steps of a temple in Meroë, the capital of the Kingdom of Kush. The temple was dedicated to Victory, likely in an attempt to subjugate Augustus in the mind of the Kushite people and establish Rome as a defeated power. Frescoes within the temple itself possibly depict Roman prisoners of war standing before a ruling Kushite, possibly Akinidad. The excavation of Meroë was funded by the Sudan Excavation Committee. After the Meroë Head's discovery, it was gifted to the British Museum by the Sudan Excavation Committee with the support of the National Art Collections Fund in 1911.

== Hamadab Stela ==
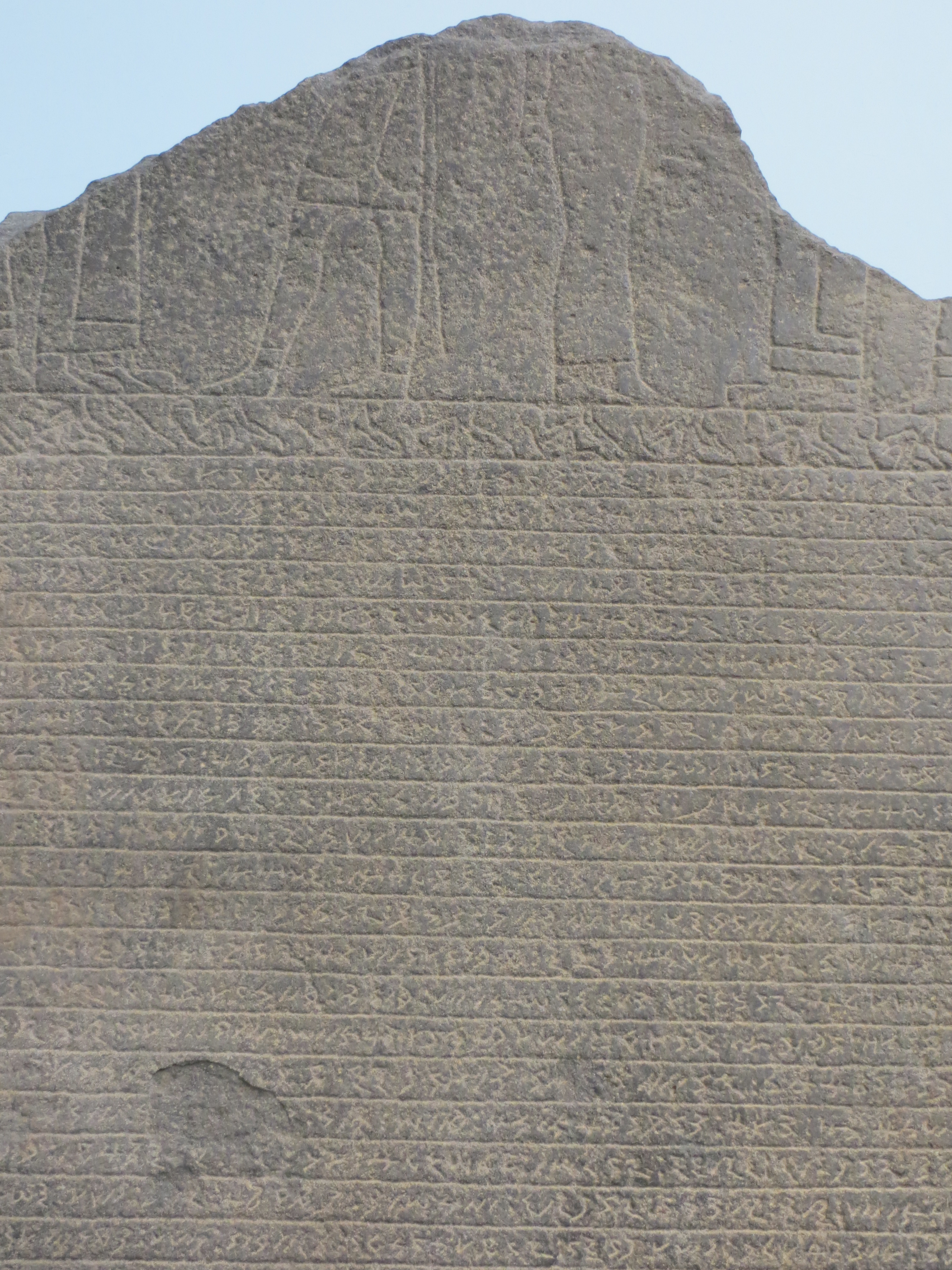
The Hamadab Stela

The Hamadab Stela, which dates to the first century BC, is made of sandstone. There are forty-five rows of Meroitic text, cursive and incised. The text mentions both Queen Amanirenas and King Akinidad, presumably her son. The incised image of the two, which features some deities, is lost; only the legs remain visible.

The stela was discovered by John Garstang, the archaeologist responsible for discovering the Meroë Head, in 1914. The stela stood at the doorway of a small temple, accompanied by a second stela on the opposite side. The stela is roughly two meters tall and one meter wide. It is incised with the Meroitic language.

The deities incised alongside Amanirenas and Akinidad are possibly Amun and Mut; the latter figure is holding an ankh, the Egyptian symbol of eternal life. Shackled prisoners are depicted beneath the ruling couple and the deities. Because the stela depicts the ruling couple with bound prisoners and dates to the first century BC, scholars believe the stela may provide a Kushite account of the campaign against Rome. It features the Meroitic term "Areme," which may translate as Rome.

== See also ==
- Kush
- Kandake
- List of monarchs of Kush
- Meroe Head
- Gaius Petronius
- Augustus
