= Monumental depictions of Amanitore =

The reign of Amanitore was considered one of the most prosperous times of the Meroitic period. She ruled alongside Natakamani, who was either her husband or her son. The success of the two rulers is evident through their work towards the building, restoration, and expansion of many temples throughout Nubia. The temples that can be accredited to the work of the two include: the Temple of Apedemak, the Amun temple B500 at Napata, the Amun temple at Meroe, the Amun Temples of Naqa and Amara, the Isis temple at Wad ben Naqa, and the Meroitic palace B1500 at Napata.

== Temple of Apedemak ==
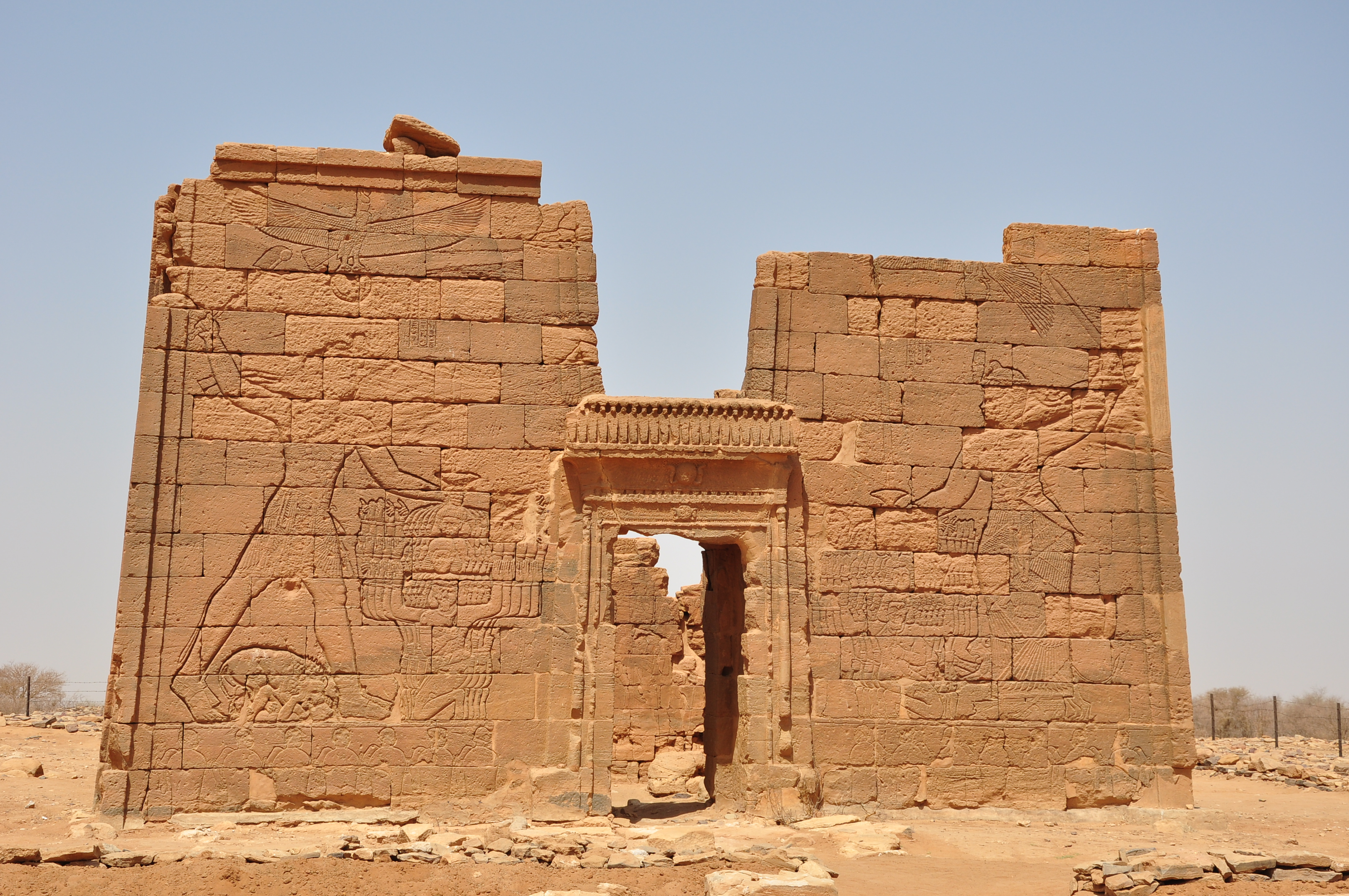
Amanitore and Natakamani smite enemies on the pylon fronts of The Temple of Apedemak

The Temple of Apedemak, also known as the Lion Temple, features many representations of Amanitore and her coregent Natakamani. The temple is located in the ancient Meroitic city of Naqa, which is about 50 km east of the Nile in what is modern-day Sudan. The temple, which was built around the middle of 1 CE, is dedicated to the Nubain lion-headed god warrior Apedemak.

The iconography displayed throughout the temple is widely considered to have derived from a similar Apedemak temple located in Musawwarat, and the two temples are frequently compared with each other in academic literature. While there are many similarities between the two temples, the iconographic program displayed throughout the Apedemak Temple in Naqa demonstrates a new ideal of Kushite myth that Amanitore and Natakamani intended to establish. Through representations of the two rulers, the temple is intended to illustrate Kushite themes of triumph of the ruler over their enemies, reciprocity between the gods and the rulers, and a male-female dualism of regency.

Scenes located on the west and main wall of the interior of the temple represent the legitimation of Natakamani and Amanitore by the gods Apedemak and Amun while in the presence of their son, Prince Arikankharor.

Uniquely, the south front of the temple displays the coregents and the prince being accompanied by only male deities. These gods include Apedemak, Amun of Napata, Khonsu (Aqedise), and Amun of Kerma. Conversely, the north front shows the coregents and prince with the solely female deities of Isis, Mut, Hathor, and Satis. As such, the southern half of the west front of the temple features depictions of the king being legitimated by Apedemak, while the northern half features depictions of the queen being legitimated by Apedemak. Similarly, within the central scenes located on the interior side walls of the temple, the king is depicted alone before Apedemak-Sarapis on the southern half of the temple. On the northern half of this interior, Amanitore is depicted alone before Zeus-Amun Sarapis. With these representations in mind, it is evident that Natakamani is associated with the south/left side of the temple, while Amanitore is associated with the north/right side. Thus, these sides can be gendered as male and female respectively.

This idea of male-female symmetry is shown throughout the side fronts of the temple as well. While the deities are split with male depictions on the south/left side and female depictions on the north/right side, Amanitore and Natakamani are shown on both side fronts of the temple. The inclusion of both coregents on the side fronts is important in conveying the concept of male-female dualism of regency in Meroitic culture. Specifically, on the south front, the two are shown each wearing a diadem featuring a lion-headed uraeus in the front. These diadems signify the symmetry of male-female regency. Correspondingly, on the north front, Amanitore is depicted wearing a Kushite skullcap crown on which there is a diadem containing two uraei—one wearing the red crown and the other wearing a white crown—and a vulture head. She is also shown wearing a crown superstructure that is made up of cow's horns and the sundisc of the goddess Isis. Next to her, Natakamani is depicted wearing an atef crown while Arikankharor is adorned in a coat decorated with varied images of Apedemak's head with a hemhem crown or a human head wearing either the plumed crown of Amun or an atef crown of Osiris. The inclusion of these adornments is intended to present the coregents and the prince as the deities Osiris, Isis, and Horus. Significantly, this iconography establishes Amanitore as at the center of the scene as she is associated with Isis and is shown wearing the double uraeus, while the king only has one uraeus. This difference in crowns of the coregents suggests an intended emphasis on Amanitore's authority in Kush.

The pylon front of the Temple of Apedemak features representations of Natakamani and Amanitore mirroring each other in victorious poses smiting enemies. In correlation with the established gender division of the temple, Amanitore is shown on the north/right tower, while Natakamani is shown on the south/left tower. Both rulers are facing the entrance to the interior of the temple and are shown to be presenting their massacred captives to the lord of the temple, Apedemak. These depictions of Amanitore and Natakamani spearing their enemies are intended to represent the theme of a ruler's triumph over his or her enemies. The depiction of a figure spearing an enemy is also a common Egyptian motif demonstrating absolute power. Moreover, located on the outer sides of the pylon is a depiction of Apedemak with the body of a snake, arms of a human, and the head of a lion as he rises from an acanthus plant. This relief of Apedemak in conjunction with representations of pierced enemies located on the back of the pylon are meant to display the theme of reciprocity between the god and the ruler. Additionally, the depictions shown on the pylon towers illustrate the invincibility of the rulers, given as a gift from the god Apedemak. This representation is also a reference to the concept of reciprocity between gods and rulers.

On the main wall of the Temple of Apedemak, Amanitore and Natakamani are shown in two symmetrical scenes, each being initiated into kingship by the figures of Apedemak and Amun. In the left scene of the wall, Apedemak is shown touching Amanitore's elbow, while the king stands behind the god and embraces him. The right scene shows an almost identical scene, although Amanitore is the one standing behind and embracing the god Amun. While the two appear to be represented in reverse order, with Amanitore being initiated on the left (male) side of the wall and Natakamani on the right (female) side, the depictions distinguish the two in terms of expressed divinity. When Amanitore is standing behind Amun, it is implied that she is already endowed with divinity from Apedemak, and thus stands on the divine side to assist Amun in the initiation of Natakamani.

== Bark stand from Wad ban Naqa ==
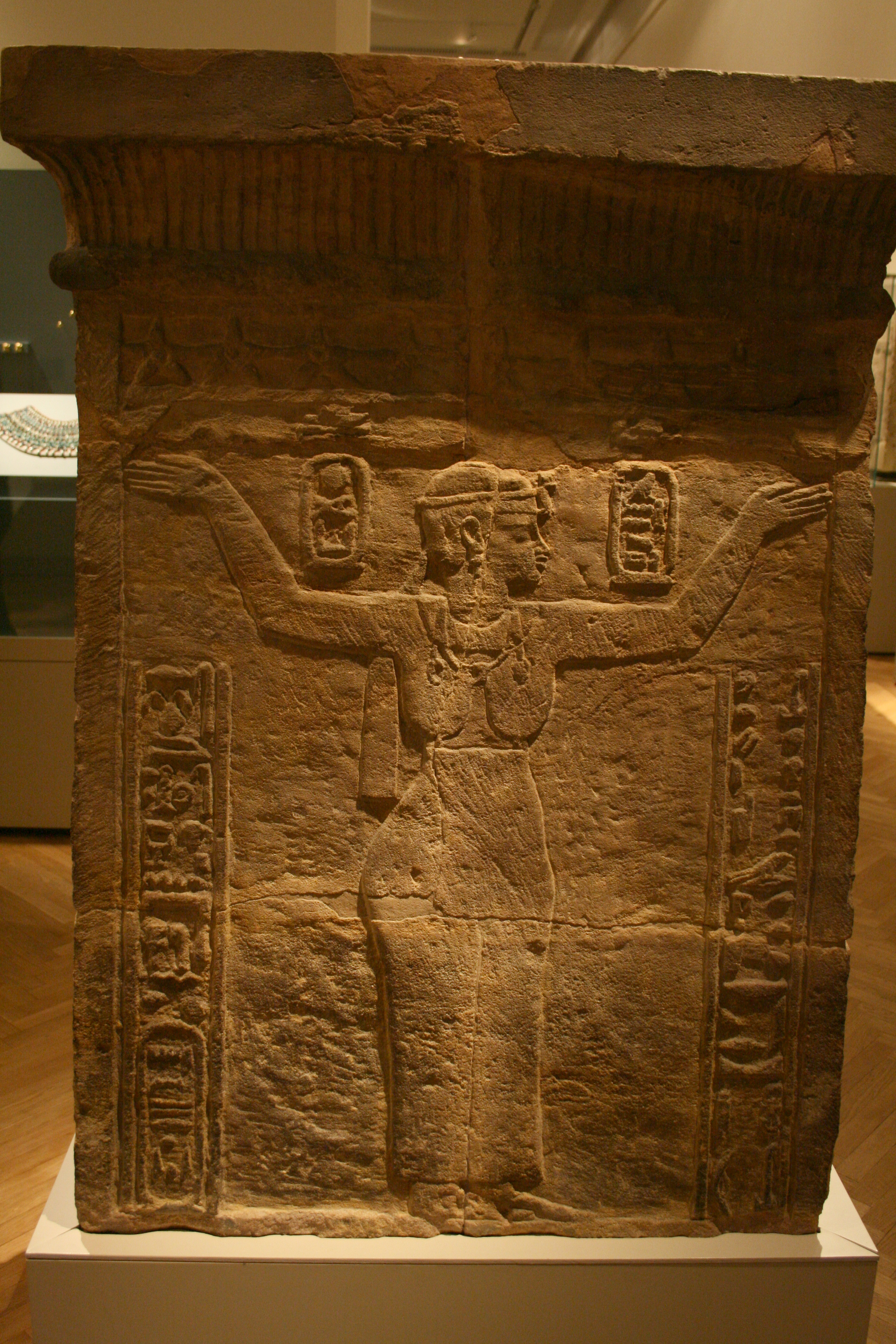
Depiction of Amanitore on bark stand found in Wad ban Naqa

Amanitore is notably represented on a bark stand that was uncovered at the Isis Temple located in Wad Ben Naqa, an ancient town located on the eastern bank of the Nile, 75 kilometers upstream from the city of Meroe. The temple was first known as the Southern Temple and was discovered during the Royal Prussian Expedition led by Carl Richard Lepsius in 1844.

This bark stand, oftentimes termed a sandstone altar, features a relief on each side, amounting to four reliefs in total. Three of these four reliefs are depictions of female figures, one of which is widely believed to be Amanitore. The fourth relief is of a male figure, presumably Natakamani. The relief that features the depiction of Amanitore—which is referred to as the eastern side of the bark stand—shows the queen bare breasted, with her hands upturned towards the sky. This representation of her is significant for several reasons. For one, the depiction of Amanitore features her body with full breasts and wide, curvy hips, which contrasted with Egyptian and Napatan representations of royal and divine women, who were traditionally illustrated as being very slim. This indicates the possibility of there being a specific body ideal in Meroitic culture that denotes a high social status associated with the combination of abundant food and the absence of physical labor. Secondly, the depiction of Meroitic queens with their breasts bare is considered to allude to their fertility and reproductive abilities which thus connects these queens to the power of the goddesses, who were said to have bestowed divinity on kings by providing them with breast milk. This ritual offering of breastmilk had historically been reserved for kings in Egyptian mythology. In Meroitic culture, however, queens were thought to have participated in this ritual as well, as implied by the depiction of their bare breasts in scenes of power such as the one shown on Amanitore's bark stand. This eastern side depiction also portrays the queen gesturing to support the starry sky. This motif of holding up the heavens is said to be a symbol of a ruler both doing the good work of the world and also holding up the highest of heaven's values, showing a distinct relationship between the queen and the gods. This motif is accompanied by multiple inscriptions on the relief that feature the names of two female deities, Re and Hathor the Great. Located in front of her face is a carved inscription, otherwise known as a cartouche, of her name written in Meroitic hieroglyphs. This particular cartouche addresses Amanitore as the “Daughter of Re, Mistress of the Diadems.” Similarly, behind her head, there is another cartouche of her royal name. Notably, this second cartouche is denoted in Egyptian hieroglyphs, rather than in Meroitic. Additionally, it again states that Amanitore is the daughter of Re, but names her as the “Mistress of the Two Lands, Merykare.” It's important to note that Merykare (also spelled Merikare) was a Heracleopolitan pharaoh who reigned from 2075 to 2040 BCE. This connection to deities as well as to an ancient pharaoh work to solidify Amanitore's place as a queen with a profound attachment to the spiritual world and the mortal world, which signifies both divine and dynastic legitimacy.

This eastern side depiction also portrays the queen gesturing to support the starry sky. This motif of holding up the heavens is said to be a symbol of a ruler both doing the good work of the world and also holding up the highest of heaven's values, showing a distinct relationship between the queen and the gods. This motif is accompanied by multiple inscriptions on the relief that feature the names of two female deities, Re and Hathor the Great. Located in front of her face is a carved inscription, otherwise known as a cartouche, of her name written in Meroitic hieroglyphs. This particular cartouche addresses Amanitore as the “Daughter of Re, Mistress of the Diadems.” Similarly, behind her head, there is another cartouche of her royal name. Notably, this second cartouche is denoted in Egyptian hieroglyphs, rather than in Meroitic. Additionally, it again states that Amanitore is the daughter of Re, but names her as the “Mistress of the Two Lands, Merykare.” It's important to note that Merykare (also spelled Merikare) was a Heracleopolitan pharaoh who reigned from 2075 to 2040 BCE. This connection to deities as well as to an ancient pharaoh work to solidify Amanitore's place as a queen with a profound attachment to the spiritual world and the mortal world, which signifies both divine and dynastic legitimacy.

In addition, Amanitore is shown wearing a uraeus on her forehead, which is another identifying symbol of power.

The stand measures at a height of 116 cm and a width of 84 cm, is made of sandstone, and was created at some point during Amanitore's rule between 1 and 25 CE. It is currently on display at the Egyptiam Museum and Papyrus Collection in Berlin, Germany.
