= Shorkaror =

Former king of Kush

Kushite King of Meroë
- Reign: Second half of the 1st century AD
- Predecessor: Amanitore and Natakamani
- Successor: Amanikhareqerem (?)
Royal titulary

Shorkaror was a king of Kush who ruled from Meroë in the second half of the 1st century AD. Shorkaror is attested as king in two inscriptions in Amara and in a large rock carving at Gebel Qeili. His identification as a king has sometimes been doubted, though the rock carving depicts him with royal regalia and attire. The carving is near to the trade route to Kassala and is the easternmost inscription of the Meroitic kings found so far.

Shorkaror is attested as a crown prince in the co-reign of Amanitore and Natakamani, meaning that he was likely their successor. He was preceded as crown prince by Arikhankharer and Arikakahtani, possibly his brothers. In older scholarship, Amanitore was believed to have been Natakamani's wife, with Shorkaror as their son. Amanitore is now known to have been Natakamani's mother, which leaves Shorkaror's specific relation to his predecessors unclear.

George Andrew Reisner believed that Shorkaror was buried in pyramid Beg. N 10 in Meroë. This is now considered unlikely given that Beg. N 10 is dated to the 2nd century BCE. Shorkaror's burial site is instead conventionally regarded as unidentified.
