= Amesemi =

Ancient Kushite goddess

- Nubian goddess of the moon and protection
Name in hieroglyphs
i H8 z F45
- Symbol: Crescent moon, Falcon
- Consort: Apedemak

Equivalents
- Greek: Selene
- Roman: Luna, Juno
- Bakongo: Nzambici
- Phrygian: Men
- Igbo: Ala
- Yoruba: Yemọja

Amesemi is a Kushite protective goddess and wife of Apedemak, the lion god. She was represented with a falcon crown, or with a crescent moon on her head (which the falcon stood on). She is often seen wearing a short necklace with large beads. She is occasionally depicted with the body of a woman and the head of a lioness, but this is very rare.

In the north reliefs of the Lion Temple in Naqa she appears together with Isis, Mut, Hathor and Satet. Compared to the goddesses of ancient Egyptian origin, Amesemi appears to be much more corpulent, which is typical for the representation of women in Meroë. On stelae in the temple of Amun in Naqa she is shown together with the Kandake Amanishakheto.

== Sites with references to Amesemi ==
=== Musawwarat es Sufra ===
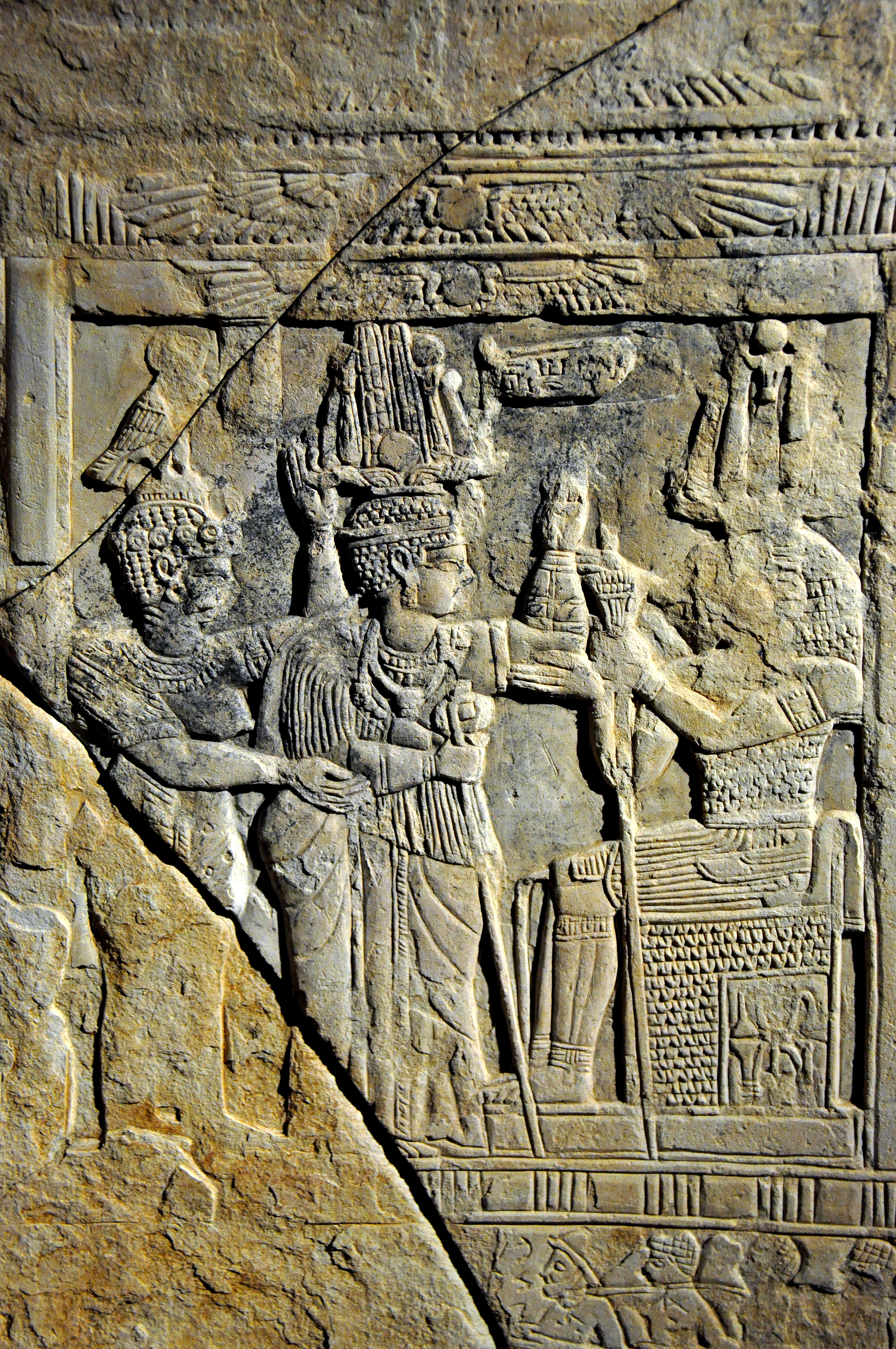
Stelae of Amanishakheto, Amesemi and Apedemak (from left to right)

The oldest mention of Amesemi comes from Musawwarat es Sufra, from the late third century BCE. In Musawwarat es Sufra she is mentioned six times in the Lion Temple. In these images, she is shown beside her husband Apedemak. On the exterior north wall, she is seen wearing a dress that is different from later illustrations of her, as her appearance was not yet standardised. Amesemi is also found in the Great Enclosure, behind her husband and touching his shoulder.

=== The temples of Naqa ===
Amesemi, the ancient Kushite goddess, was depicted either as fully human (left) or with the head of a lioness

In the Temple of Amun Naqa 200, Amesemi is in a "triadic group on the exterior west wall. She follows a ram-headed deity presumably to be identified as Amun-Apedemak."

Temple F in the ancient town of Naqa, also known as Naga, has the earliest portrayals of Amesemi in the town. These depictions were made between 170 and 150 BCE. She is depicted at the southern end of the interior south-east wall. She is standing behind an enthroned Apedemak and is touching his head.

In the Lion Temple of Naga, she is depicted at least two times. There is an image of her on the exterior north wall which contains an inscription which translates to "Oh Amesemi, who is in [.]mami[.], may she give them life, oh Amesemi."

In the Great Amun Temple of Naga, the goddess is found in the hypostyle. In this image, Amanitore is seen adoring the goddess. There are not any other depictions of Amesemi in the Great Amun Temple in Naga but it is possible that there were paintings of the goddess during the use of this temple.

In the smaller temple of Amun, Amesemi is illustrated on the exterior west wall with her husband. She appears here a second time, but this time she is with who is assumed to be Amun-Apedemak. Amesemi appears in a few other places in this site, including on many different stelae.

=== Other depictions of Amesemi ===
Amesemi can also be found in the Amun Temple of Amara, offered a bowl by Prince Sorakarora. She is portrayed in the kiosk of Natakamani and Amanitore, where she is behind the Lion God. Amesemi was also found depicted on smaller objects, including a seal impression alongside her husband, and different types of jewelry such as beads, armlets and ring plates.
