= Amanikhatashan =

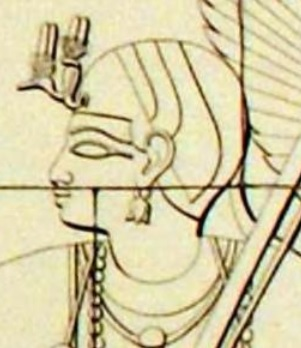
- Amanikhatashan as depicted in her tomb

Kushite Queen of Meroë
- Reign: Middle 2nd century CE
- Predecessor: Amanitenmemide
- Successor: Tarekeniwal
Royal titulary
- Burial: Tomb at Meroë (Beg. N 18)
- Dynasty: Meroitic period

Amanikhatashan was a queen regnant of the Kingdom of Kush, probably ruling in the middle 2nd century CE. Amanikhatashan is known only from her tomb in Meroë, designated as Beg. N 18.

The objects found in Amanikhatashan's tomb place her as reigning at some point in the first or second centuries CE. The artwork in the tomb is stylistically close to the artwork in the tomb Beg. N 16, which suggests that Amanikhatashan reigned close to the ruler buried in that tomb. Beg. N 16 may have belonged to King Amanikhareqerem and dates to the end of the 1st century CE. Assuming a mid-2nd century CE reign, Amanikhatashan is conventionally (speculatively) placed as the successor of Amanitenmemide and the predecessor of Tarekeniwal.
