= Basa, Sudan =

Village in Sudan, site of ancient temple

Coordinates: 16.699778°N 33.983411°E

Basa (variation: Jabal Basa) is a village in Sudan. It lies 250 kilometres (160 mi) northeast of Khartoum in Butana, upstream of Wadi Hawa, near Meroë and the Nile. Near Basa is a completely decayed temple which was excavated in 1907. It was built by Amanikhabale and probably dedicated to Apedemak, the lion-headed warrior god worshiped in Nubia by Meroitic peoples. Some fallen lion sculptures, each weighing two tons, were found by Francis Llewellyn Griffith. In 1970, five of the lion sculptures were recovered and placed at the entrance of the National Museum of Sudan, as were two stone frog sculptures. Griffith also excavated a limestone sundial which dates to Roman times.
