= Arikhankharer =

- Crown prince of Kush
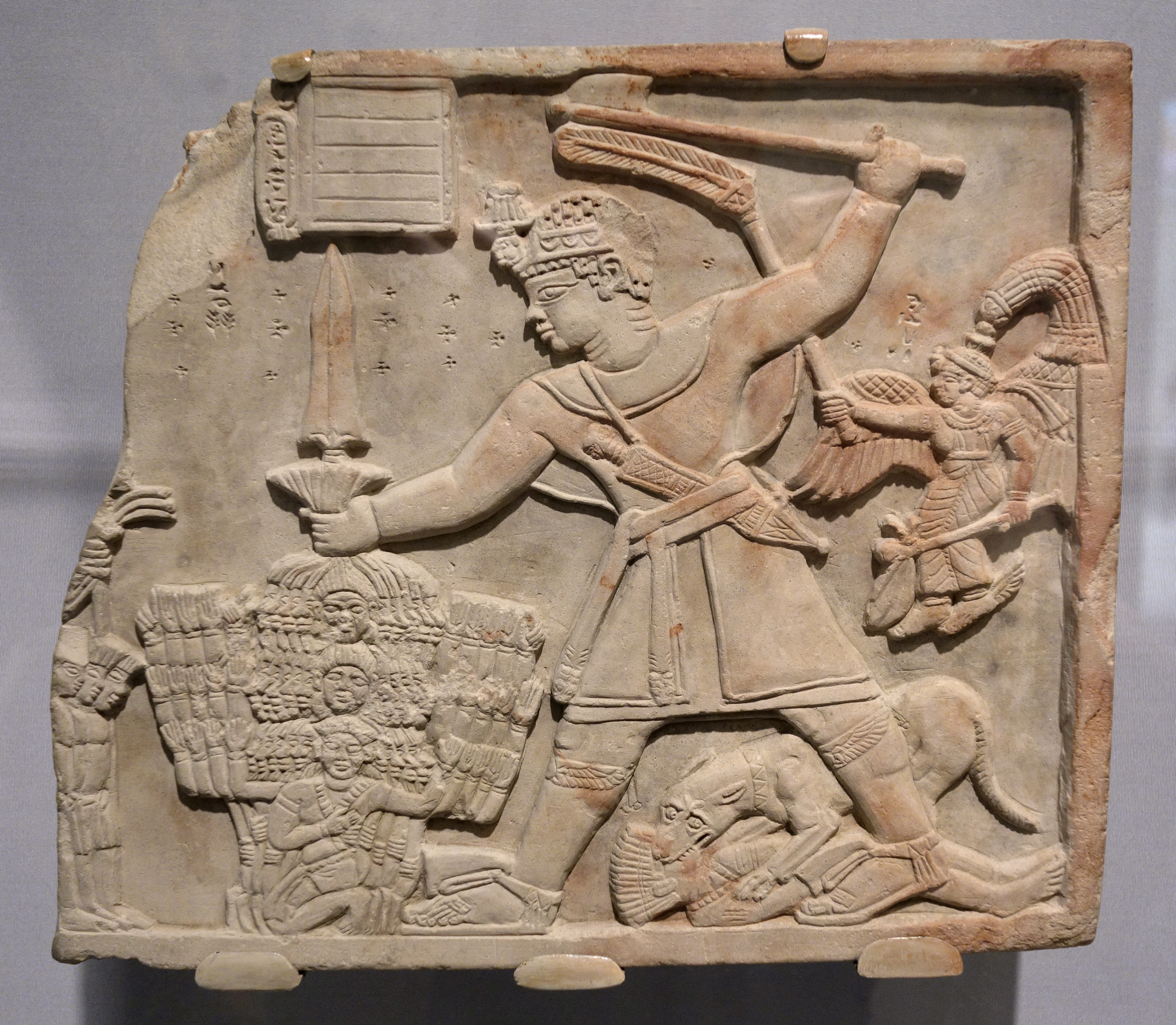
- Prince Arikankharer slaying his enemies (Worcester Art Museum, Worcester, MA)
- Born: unknown
- Died: 1st century AD
- Burial: Pyramid 5 (?), North Cemetery, Meroë
Names
- Arikhankharer (Arikḫror, ’Irk-nḫr)
- Dynasty: Meroitic
- Father: Natakamani
- Mother: Amanitore

Arikhankharer (also transliterated Arikankharor, Arrikharêr; in Meroitic hieroglyphics Arikḫror; in Egyptian hieroglyphs ’Irk-nḫr) was crown prince of the Meroitic Kingdom of Kush in the first half of the 1st century AD.

Arikhankharer was the eldest son of the co-regents Natakamani and Amanitore, and is depicted with them in reliefs in the temple of Apedemak at Naqa and the temple of Amun at Meroë. His royal dress and other aspects of his iconography, along with the Meroitic title pqrtr and the Egyptian throne name Ꜥnḫ-kꜢ-Rᵉ (Ankh-ke-re), confirm his status as the heir apparent. In a relief now in the Worcester Art Museum, he is depicted in royal dress, smiting his enemies and watched over by the winged goddess Tly (otherwise unattested).

Arikhankharer died before reaching the throne and was succeeded as crown prince by his brother Arikakahtani. He may have been buried in pyramid 5 of the north cemetery at Meroë (Begarawiyah N 5), which was excavated in 1921 by an expedition sponsored by Harvard University and the Museum of Fine Arts, Boston. Roman glass and other imported objects from the tomb suggest a date around the middle of the 1st century AD. The tomb also produced fragments of Greek bronze sculpture, including two small heads of Dionysos.
