= Amanikhabale =

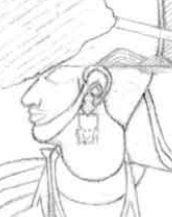
- Damaged portrait of the king buried in Beg. N 2, possibly Amanikhabale

Kushite King of Meroë
- Reign: First half of the first century CE (?)
- Predecessor: Nawidemak
- Successor: Natakamani and Amanitore (?)
Royal titulary
Prenomen
Neb-maat-Re
Nb-m3ˁt-Rˁ
Lord of Maat, Re

M23 X1 L2 X1	ra mAat nb
Nomen
Amanichabale
in Meroitic hieroglyphs

G39 N5	m n n r E10 Sw rw
- Burial: Pyramid Beg. N 2 at Meroë (?)

Amanikhabale (also transliterated Astabarqaman) was a King of Kush who probably ruled in the first half of the 1st century CE. Amanikhabale is known from inscriptions from Kawa, Basa, and Naqa, as well as a broken stela from Meroë. The quality and scale of the monuments on which Amanikhabale's inscriptions have been found, as well as their geographical distribution, indicates that he had a prosperous reign.

George Andrew Reisner suggested that Amanikhabale was buried in Pyramid 2 at the North cemetery (Beg. N 2) at Meroe (Bagrawiyah), largely supported by scholars since. Amanikhabale's name is known from a fragment of a table found in Beg. N 3, which can be fitted together with fragments in Beg. N 2 and Beg. N 4. The table designates his mother as the queen regnant Nawidemak. This further supports Beg. N 2 as his burial since it has close palaeographic similarities with Nawidemak's tomb, Bar. 6.
