= Amanitenmemide =

Nubian king

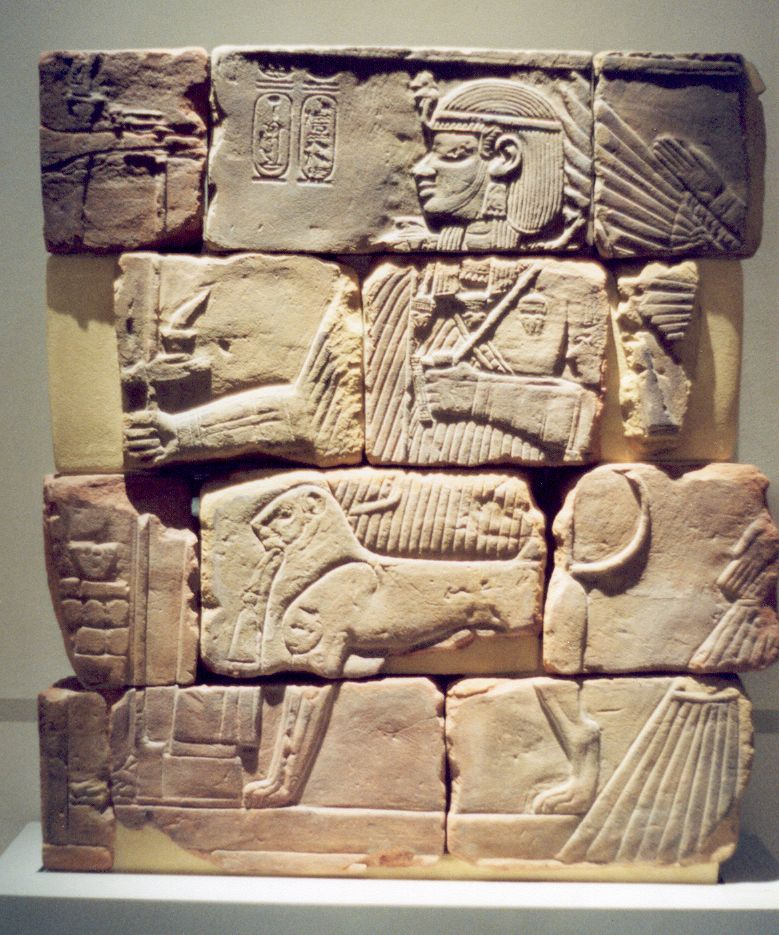
- The relief of the chapel in Berlin

Kushite King of Meroë
- Reign: End of the 1st century–first half of the 2nd century CE
- Predecessor: Amanikhareqerem?
- Successor: Amanikhatashan
Royal titulary
- Burial: Pyramid at Meroë (Beg. N 17)
- Dynasty: Meroitic period

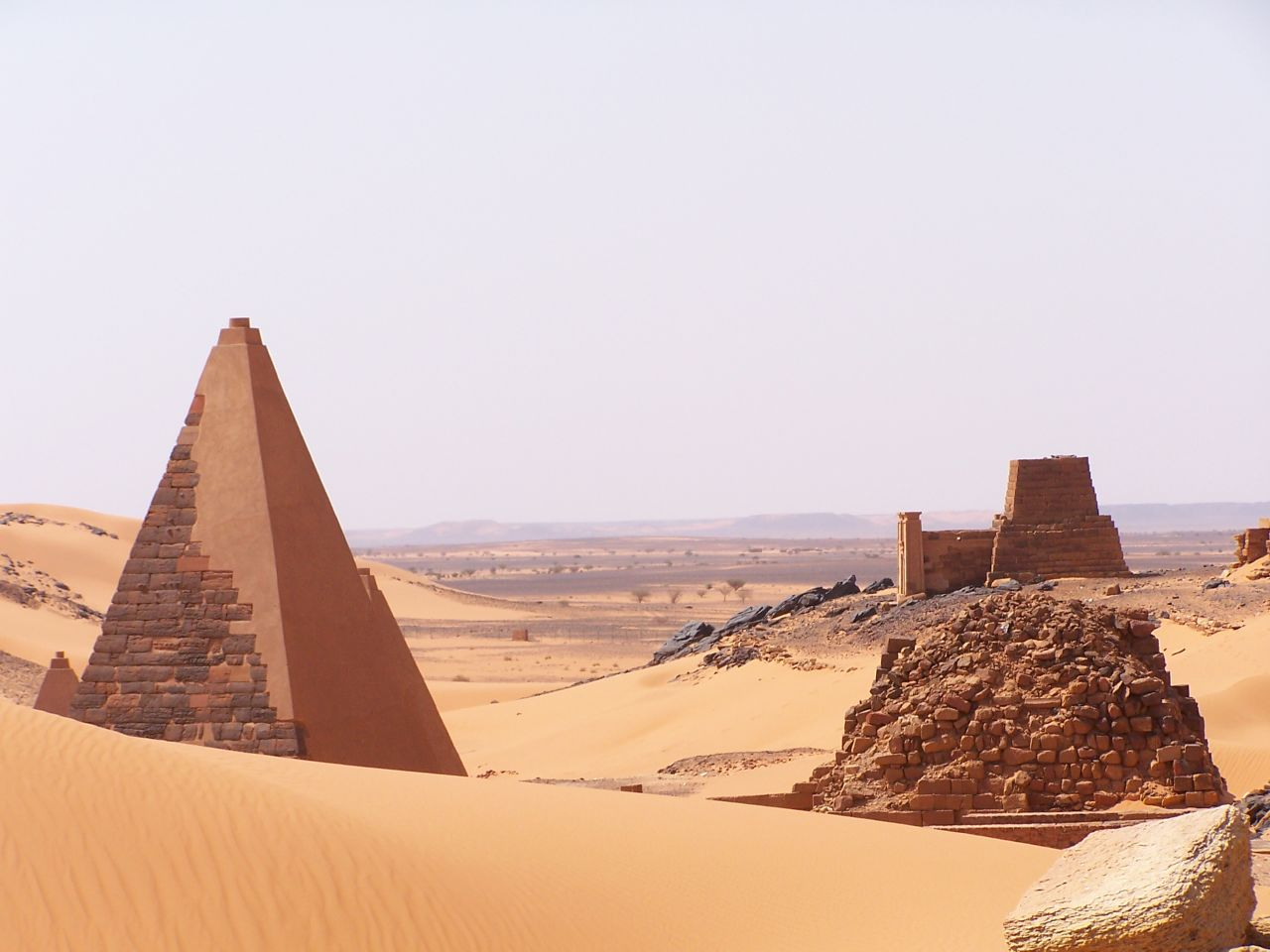
The pyramid of Amanitenmemide (on the right in the distance)

Amanitenmemide was a Nubian king whose throne name was Nebmaatre. His name is written in Meroitic, while his throne name is written in classical Egyptian hieroglyphs.

Amanitenmemide is known from his pyramid in Meroë (Beg. N 17) and from an inscription in the same city. The pyramid occupies an area of 8.6 X 8.6 m and is, therefore, one of the smaller royal pyramids at Meroe. In front of the pyramid there was a decorated chapel. The decoration was copied by the Lepsius expedition. One wall was brought to Berlin, where it is displayed in the Neues Museum. Another, now only preserved in six blocks, is in the British Museum in London.

Three skeletons were found in the burial chamber of the pyramid - two of them belonging to women, the third to a man of about 30 years, which are, perhaps, the remains of the king himself.

There is little evidence for dating the king. The small size of the pyramid indicates a date after Natakamani, under whom the pyramids in general became smaller. It has been suggested that Amanitenmemide ruled from the end of the 1st century to the first half of the 2nd century CE.

== Literature ==
- Hofmann, Inge. Beiträge zur meroitischen Chronologie, St. Augustin bei Bonn 1978, p. 139, ISBN 3-921389-80-1.
- Török, László, in: Fontes Historiae Nubiorum, Vol. III, Bergen 1998, p. 914-916, ISBN 82-91626-07-3.
