= Amanikhalika =

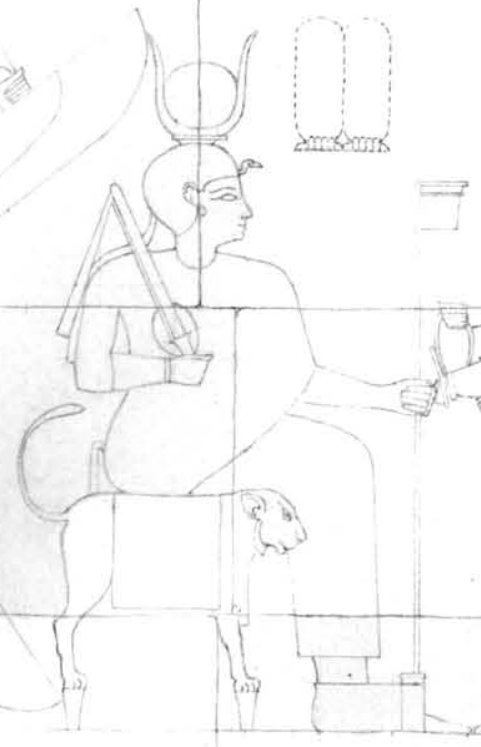
- Relief of the Kushite ruler buried in Beg N. 32, often identified as Amanikhalika

Kushite Queen of Meroë
- Reign: Second half of the 2nd century CE
- Predecessor: Tarekeniwal
- Successor: Aritenyesbokhe
- Consort: Tarekeniwal
- Children: Aritenyesbokhe
- Burial: Pyramid at Meroë (Beg N. 32)
- Dynasty: Meroitic period

Amanikhalika is the name often attributed to a Kushite queen regnant buried in pyramid Beg N. 32 in Meroë. If the attribution is correct, Amanikhalika would have reigned in the second half of the 2nd century CE based on her known relations to other monarchs.

== Sources and chronology ==
Amanikhalika's name is known only from the offering table of the later king Aritenyesbokhe, which identifies Aritenyesbokhe's parents as Tarekeniwal and Amanikhalika. Tarekeniwal is presumably identical to the Kushite king of the same name, buried in pyramid Beg. N 19. If Amanikhalika is to be identified with the queen in Beg. N 32 she was thus originally Tarekeniwal's queen consort. Identification with Amanikhalika would place this queen's reign in the second half of the 2nd century CE, since the reigns of both Tarekeniwal and Aritenyesbokhe are dated to this time.

Beg. N 32 is the tomb of a Kushite queen regnant, dated to some point between the mid-2nd century CE and the mid-3rd century CE. The tomb does not preserve the name of the queen buried but was speculatively attributed to Amanikhalika in the 1950s. Although hypothetical, this identification is maintained by a large number of modern scholars. Some scholars, such as Kuckertz (2021) and Droa-Krupe & Fink (2021) have doubted the identification and consider Beg. N 32 to be the tomb of an otherwise unknown queen.
