= Tarekeniwal =

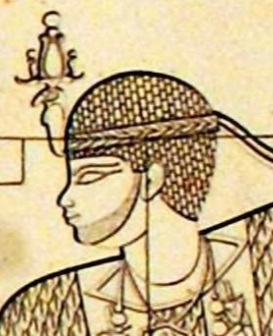
- Portrait of Tarekeniwal from his tomb

Kushite King of Meroë
- Reign: Second half of the 2nd century AD
- Predecessor: Amanikhatashan
- Successor: Amanikhalika
- Consort: Amanikhalika
- Children: Aritenyesbokhe
- Burial: Meroe: Beg. N 19

Tarekeniwal was a Kushite King of Meroë of whom little is known. He likely reigned in the second half of the 2nd century AD. Tarekeniwal is only known from his pyramid in Meroe (Beg. N 19). His name appears on the pylon of the cult chapel in front of the pyramid, which was in modern times restored. The chapel and its decoration is still well preserved.

Imagery in Tarekeniwal's tomb places unusually strong emphasis on him as a triumphant warrior. The offering table of the later king Aritenyesbokhe identifies Aritenyesbokhe ruler as a son of Tarekeniwal, presumably the same person as the king. The table also identifies Amanikhalika as Aritenyesbokhe's mother and thus as Tarekeniwal's queen.

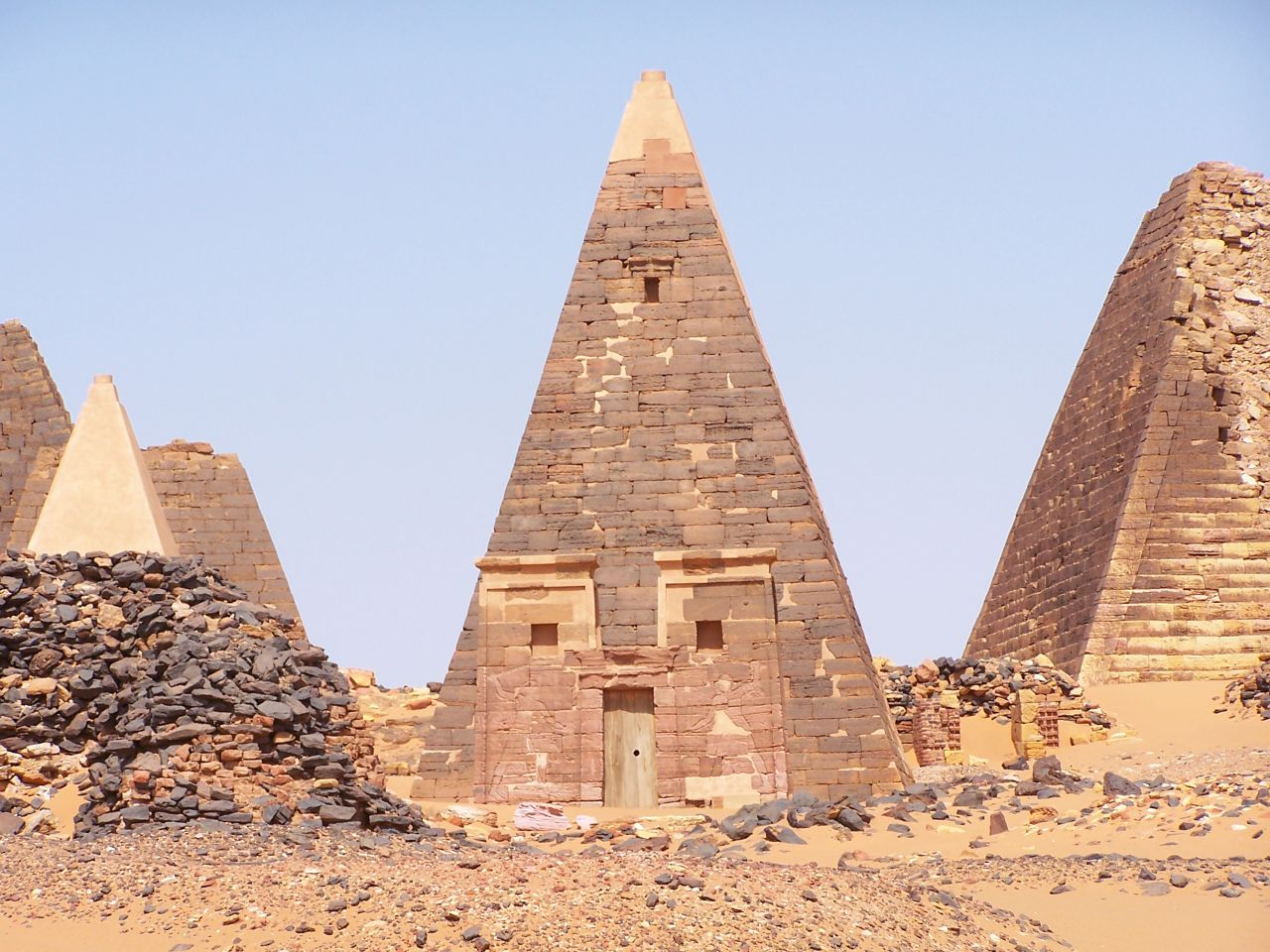
Pyramid of Tarekeniwal (middle)

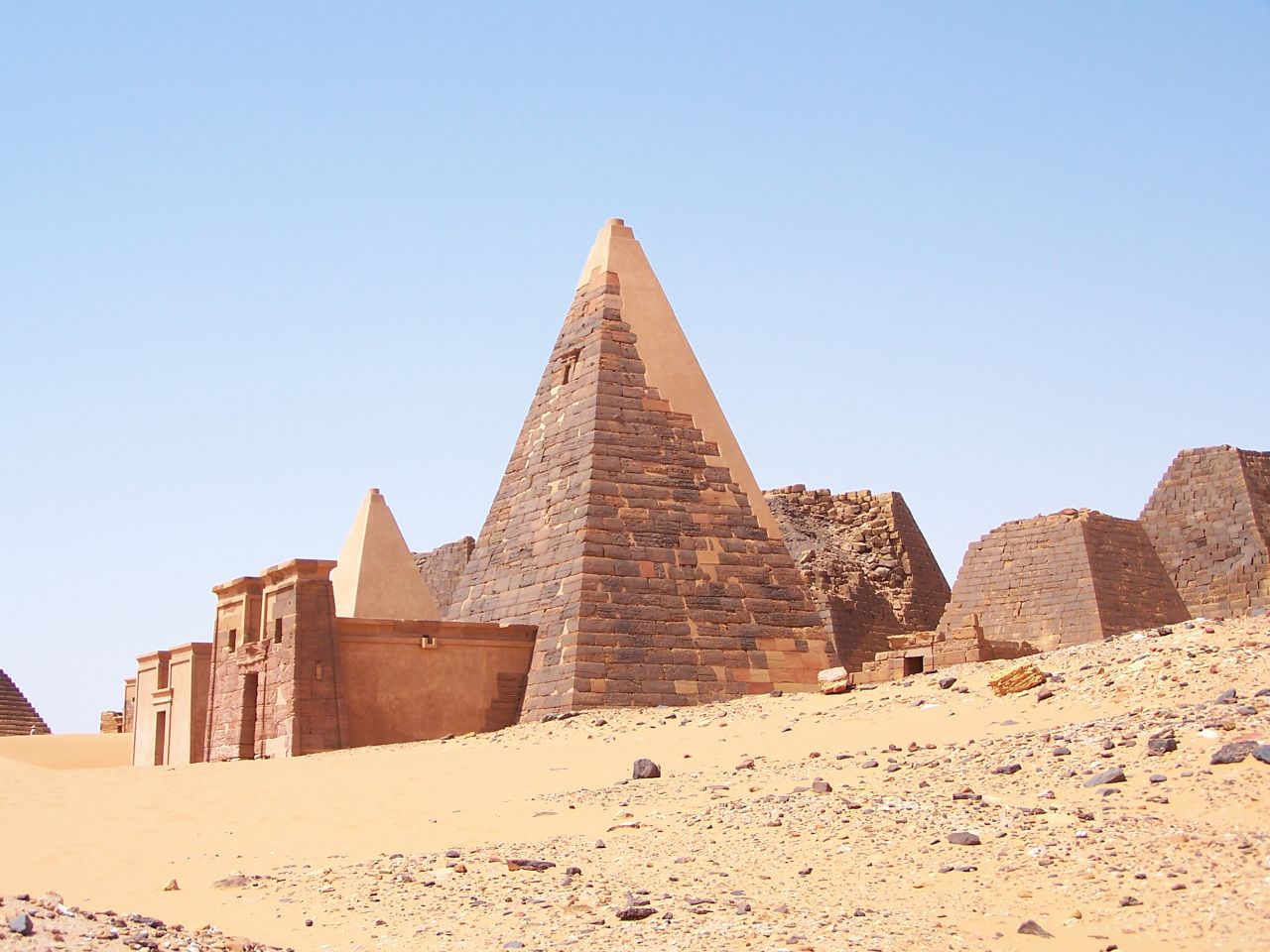
Pyramid of Tarekeniwal (front)

== Literature ==
- Hofmann, Inge. Beiträge zur meroitischen Chronologie, St. Augustin bei Bonn 1978, p. 140, ISBN 3-921389-80-1
- Török, László in: Fontes Historiae Nubiorum, Vol. III, Bergen 1998, p. 935–936, ISBN 82-91626-07-3
