= Nawidemak =

4th Kandake of Kush

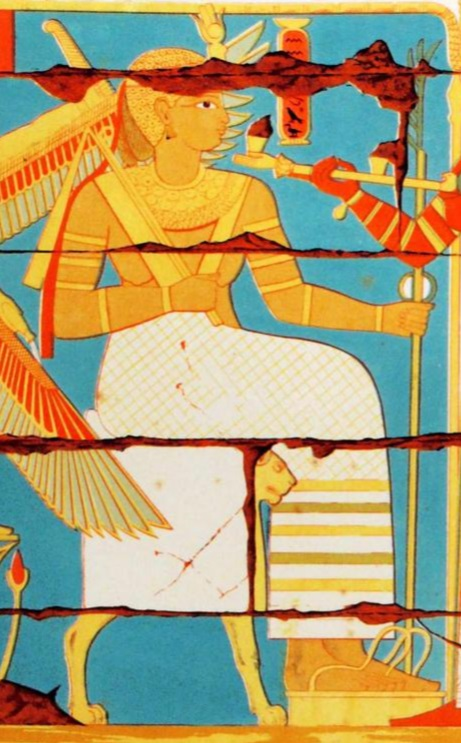
- Depiction of Nawidemak in her tomb

Kushite Queen of Meroë
- Reign: First half of the 1st century AD (?)
- Predecessor: Unknown king (Bar. 2) (?)
- Successor: Amanikhabale
Royal titulary
- Burial: Meroe (Bar. 6)

Nawidemak was a queen regnant of Kush who probably ruled in the first half of the 1st century AD. She is known from the wall relief of her burial chamber, as well as a gold plaque.

== Biography ==
Nawidemak was a ruler of the Kingdom of Kush, either from the 1st century BC, or 1st century AD. Objects from the late reign of Roman emperor Augustus or even later, found in Nawidemak's tomb, support the later date.

Nawidemak is known from the wall relief of her burial chamber at (Bar. 6), which shows her wearing the royal coat, sash and tasselled cord; these elements are more commonly shown with male rulers of Kush. Both the fastening knot on her coat, and on the cord feature a couchant animal, which is another symbol of royalty. This symbol makes its latest appearance in Nawidemak's relief, having been used in Kushite designs since the 3rd century BC. In the relief, she wears the crown of Osiris on her head.

On the northern wall of the chamber, Nawidemak is shown with a long skirt and with bare breasts, which is symbolic of her fertility and as the mother of another ruler. A gold tablet referring to Nawidemak is included in the collection of the Allen Memorial Art Museum in Oberlin, Ohio. Nawidemak is assumed to have been the mother of Amanikhabale; if true, Amanikhabale was likely her direct successor on the throne.

Because her pyramid was built at Gebel Barkal, instead of Meroe as was customary at the time, there may have been a change of dynasty at this time.

Nawidemak was a female ruler of Kush, known as a kandake. These rulers are each referred to in the New Testament of the Bible, without differentiation between them. Based on the idea that she ruled during the 1st Century AD, Nawidemak is thought to be the Kandake referred to in the eighth chapter of the Acts of the Apostles, whose treasurer was converted to Christianity by Philip the Evangelist.

== See also ==
- List of monarchs of Kush
- Kandake
