= Amara, Nubia =

Coordinates: 20°50′N 30°23′E

Amara
- City
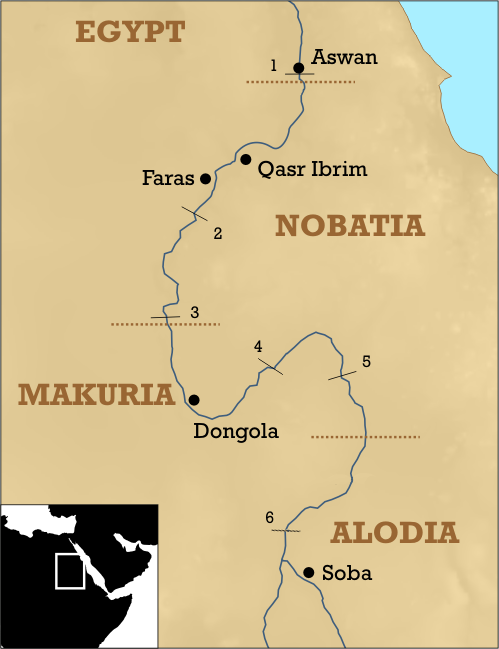
- Country: Nubia
- Established: 19th Dynasty
- Founder: Seti I

Amara, usually distinguished as Amara East and Amara West, is the modern name of an ancient Egyptian city in Nubia, in what today is Sudan. Amara West is located on the west side of the Nile, eastern Amara, on the eastern side of the Nile. The towns lie north of the 3rd Cataract of the Nile, near the modern-day town of Abri.

== Amara West ==
Amara West was founded in the 19th Dynasty by Seti I and was probably, at least temporarily, an administrative center. Here was the official residence of the representative of Kush. The fortified city was about 200 x 200 m. Here stood a great temple of Ramesses II, excavated between 1938 and 1950. The town's name was first per-Menmaatre (House of Seti I), was then in Per-Rameses-meri-Amon (House of Ramesses II), and finally changed to Chenem-Waset.

The place has been under excavation since 2008 by a team from the British Museum under Neil Spencer.

During the New Kingdom, inhabitants of Amara West created tombs sharing similar funerary cultures like the models created in Ancient Egypt. The chapel’s architecture is similar to Ancient Egyptian temples. Amara West’s tombs represented the shared emphasis of life and death in relation to the Egyptian belief system.

Funerary objects in Amara West consisted of scarabs, amulets, Egyptian deities, jewelry, copper alloy objects and lots of pottery.

== Amara East ==
Amara East was significant in the Meroitic period. The Meroitic name was Pedeme. Here was a temple built by Natakamani. The Lepsius expedition still saw and partially documented eight decorated pillars. Today, only a few remnants of the city walls exist.

== Bibliogrophy ==
- Fairman, H. W. (1938). "Preliminary report on the excavations at Sesebi (Sudla) and 'Amārah West, Anglo-Egyptian Sudan, 1937–8". The Journal of Egyptian Archaeology, 24(2), pp. 151–156.
- Fairman, H. W. (1939). "Preliminary report on the excavations at 'Amārah West, Anglo-Egyptian Sudan, 1938–9". The Journal of Egyptian Archaeology, 25(2), pp. 139–144.
- Fairman, H. W. (1948). "Preliminary report on the excavations at Amarah West, Anglo-Egyptian Sudan, 1947–8". The Journal of Egyptian Archaeology, 34, pp. 3–11.
- Shinnie, P. L. (1951). "Preliminary report on the excavations at 'Amārah West, 1948–49 and 1949–50". The Journal of Egyptian Archaeology, 37, pp. 5–11.
- Spencer, Patricia (1997). Amara West I: The Architectural Report. Egypt Exploration Society Excavation Memoir 63. London: Egypt Exploration Society.
- Spencer, Patricia (2002). Amara West II: The Cemetery and Pottery Corpus. Egypt Exploration Society Excavation Memoir 69. London: Egypt Exploration Society.
- Spencer, Patricia (2016). Amara West III: The Scenes and Texts of the Ramesside Temple. London: Egypt Exploration Society.
- Spencer, Neal (2009). "Cemeteries and a Late Ramesside Suburb at Amara West". Sudan & Nubia, 13, pp. 47–61.
- Spencer, Neal (2010). "Nubian Architecture in an Egyptian Town? Building E12.11 at Amara West". Sudan & Nubia, 14, pp. 15–24.
- Spencer, Neal (2014). "Creating and Re-shaping Egypt in Kush: Responses at Amara West". Journal of Ancient Egyptian Interconnections, 6(1), pp. 42–61.
- Spencer, Neal, Anna Stevens, and Michaela Binder (eds.) (2014). Amara West: Living in Egyptian Nubia. London: British Museum.
- Spencer, Neal, Anna Stevens, and Michaela Binder (eds.) (2017). Nubia in the New Kingdom: Lived Experience, Pharaonic Control and Indigenous Traditions. British Museum Publications on Egypt and Sudan 3. Leuven: Peeters.
- Rademakers, Frederik W., et al. (2023). "Metals and Pigments at Amara West: Cross-Craft Perspectives on Practices and Provisioning in New Kingdom Nubia". Journal of Archaeological Science, 153, article 105766.
