= Apedemak =

Ancient Nubian deity

Apedemek
- Nubian lion god of war
- image of Apedemak based on ancient depictions
Name in hieroglyphs
M17 p r Aa11 k R8 A40
Apedemak
Jprmk
- Major cult center: Lion Temple, Naqa
- Consort: Amesemi

Equivalents
- Greek: Apollo
- Roman: Sol

Apedemak or Apademak (originally, due to the absence of the /p/ phoneme in Meroitic, it was probably pronounced 'abademak', meaning 'father king') was a major deity in the ancient Nubian and Kushite pantheon. He was often depicted as a figure with a male human torso and a lion head, and at the temple of Naqa with a snake's body and a lion's head. Apedemak also appears as a three-headed leonine god with four arms. Apedemak was a war god worshiped by the Meroitic peoples inhabiting Kush. There are no counterparts of him in Ancient Egyptian religion. As a war god, Apedemak came to symbolize martial power, military conquest, and empire. Apedemak is also closely associated with Amun, the state-sponsored Egyptian deity, and is assumed to hold an equal level of importance. In Meroe, he became the head of the Kushite pantheon.

== Origins ==
Because inlays of lions were originally used for highly-esteemed individuals in burials, it is possible that these early Kerman lion figures evolved to become Apedemak. However, it is unknown whether the Kermans venerated them as gods with dedicated temples, such as those in later Napatan and Meroitic periods, or if they were folkloric symbols.

Apedemak primarily appears during the Meroitic Period. Apedemak seems to have been venerated in an animistic tradition during the Kerma period, rather than the polytheistic style of other cultures in the region.

At least by the 3rd century BCE, Apedemak appears to have become an important deity to the peoples living in Upper Nubia. Numerous temples to Apedemak are concentrated in the Butana region, south of the capital city of Meroë. The absence of cult places to him in areas further north points to his southern origin.

== Characteristics ==
Apedemak is chiefly understood as a war god. By extension, he is also considered a god of conquest and military prowess. In reliefs found in both the Lion Temple at Musawwarat es-Sufra and the Sanctuary at Naqa, Apedemak wears leather armor or a cuirass and carries a bow and arrow in his hand, weapons that were associated with the Nubians throughout their history. Other representations show Apedemak killing an enemy, or holding the chain of an enemy captured in battle. At the Temple at Naqa, he is also depicted as a flying hawk with the winged sun-disc, suggesting that he has solar aspects and may have been also seen, in part, as a sun god. Since Apedemak mostly appears on reliefs in similar fashions, he is mostly associated with his role as a god of war.

Additionally, Apedemak is also considered to be a creator and fertility god. One hymn at the Lion Temple at Musawwarat es-Sufra addresses him as "[the god] who provides nourishment for all mankind in his name of 'one awakening unharmed'...lord of life'." Another example of Apedemak in this role is in a relief at the Sanctuary at Naqa. Here Apedemak is depicted holding cereals, a symbol of fertility. Though evidence for Apedemak appearing in this role is not as clear or conspicuous, it is significant that some evidence appears at these two important temples.

As the Meroitic god of empire, Apedemak is involved in the process of electing and legitimizing new leaders. Multiple reliefs depict kings and queens in the process of royal investiture, election, and coronation. In these scenes, Apedemak is one deity who invests the new royal by touching their elbow.

Apedemak has also been associated with being a warrior, courage, kingship and royalty, and with his consort Amesemi, a lunar deity.

=== Associations with Amun ===
During the New Kingdom periods, the Egyptian god Amun was adopted by the Nubians as the chief god of empire. After Apedemak's first attestations during the Meroitic period, it appears that Amun was either held in equal importance or was surpassed by the indigenous Apedemak. Amun's associations with water and fertility (connected to the Nile's inundation) also belonged to Apedemak. In addition, along with Amun, Apedemak was the god who conferred royal power and induct new leaders, as seen on column reliefs and the interiors of the Temple of Musawwarat es-Sufra.

== Major temples ==
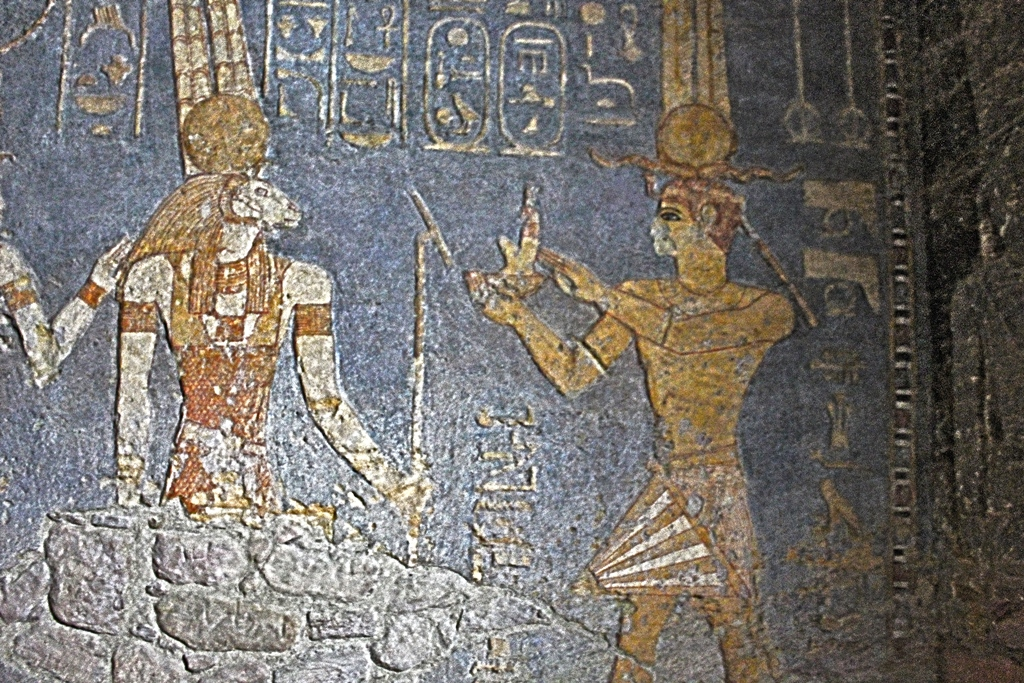
Apedemak (left) with Pharaoh Taharqa in the Jebel Barkal Temple of Mut

A number of Meroitic temples dedicated to this deity are known from the Western Butana region of Sudan. There are temples at Naqa, Meroe, and Musawwarat es-Sufra. Information about Apedemak in the temples at Meroe are forthcoming. At present, the two main temples for Apedemak that have been studied and published are the Lion Temple at Musawwarat es-Sufra and the Apedemak Sanctuary at Naqa. It is likely, however, that there were many informal places where Apedemak's cult was practiced, as mentioned in some literary sources.

=== The Lion Temple at Musawwarat es-Sufra ===
The earliest appearance of Apedemak is at the Lion Temple at Musawwarat es-Sufra. Built in the late 3rd century BCE, during the reign of King Arnekhamani, this temple is believed to be the earliest representation of Apedemak. Though many different deities appear in this temple complex, Apedemak is understood to be the primary deity, as his depiction is the most prominent. On reliefs along the north wall, Apedemak appears with other Nubian and Egyptian deities, such as the ram-headed Amun, Satis, Horus, and Isis. The west wall, which is not as well preserved, contains only part of a figure recognizable as Apedemak. American Egyptologist Louis Vico Žabkar argues that some of the columns of the temple, though not including Apedemak in his usual lion-headed form, might instead represent Apedemak in complete lion form. Several hymns inscribed on the walls mention the Butana region of Nubia, suggesting to some scholars that this might be where Apedemak's cult originated. Other hymns in this temple allude to Apedemak's role as a creator and fertility god.

=== The Apedemak Sanctuary at Naqa ===
Constructed during the leadership of Natakamani and Amanitore, the Sanctuary at Naqa is located about 120 kilometers northeast of Khartoum. This site dates to the end of the 2nd century to the end of the 1st century BCE and contains many edifices and temples. It is thought that this temple was derived from the earlier temple at Musawwarat es-Sufra. At this sanctuary, Apedemak appears carrying a bow and a quiver, highlighting Apedemak's character as both a hunter and a warrior god. The appearance of Amun and Apedemak together might suggest a sense of co-regency and between the deities in this region.

==== Alternative representations of Apedemak at Naqa ====
Two unusual representations of Apedemak at this site are without parallel and have been the cause behind much discussion. Along the side of a wall, Apedemak appears depicted as a three-headed leonine god with four arms. It may be that the artist decided to show Apedemak turning his head to three different subjects: the king on the left, the viewer in the center, and the queen to the right. Another column appears to show Apedemak as a tall, coiled snake with a human upper torso and Apedemak's characteristic lion head. In his book on Apedemak, Louis Žabkar discusses that Apedemak's snake form might be an indication of his apotropaic features. In other words, it is possible that Apedemak could have warded off snakes, and the representation on the column was instead to show this. These two depiction are unique, as Apedemak is typically represented as a figure with a lion head and a male human body.

== Other forms of worship ==
At present, Apedemak is best understood due to his depictions in temples. However, it is possible that other representations of lions, such as statutes and statuettes, may have been depictions of Apedemak. There are some small objects, such as seals and jewelry, that depict lions that might have represented Apedemak as well. The level by which people worshiped the deity outside of official temple worship is poorly understood at this time.

== Gallery ==
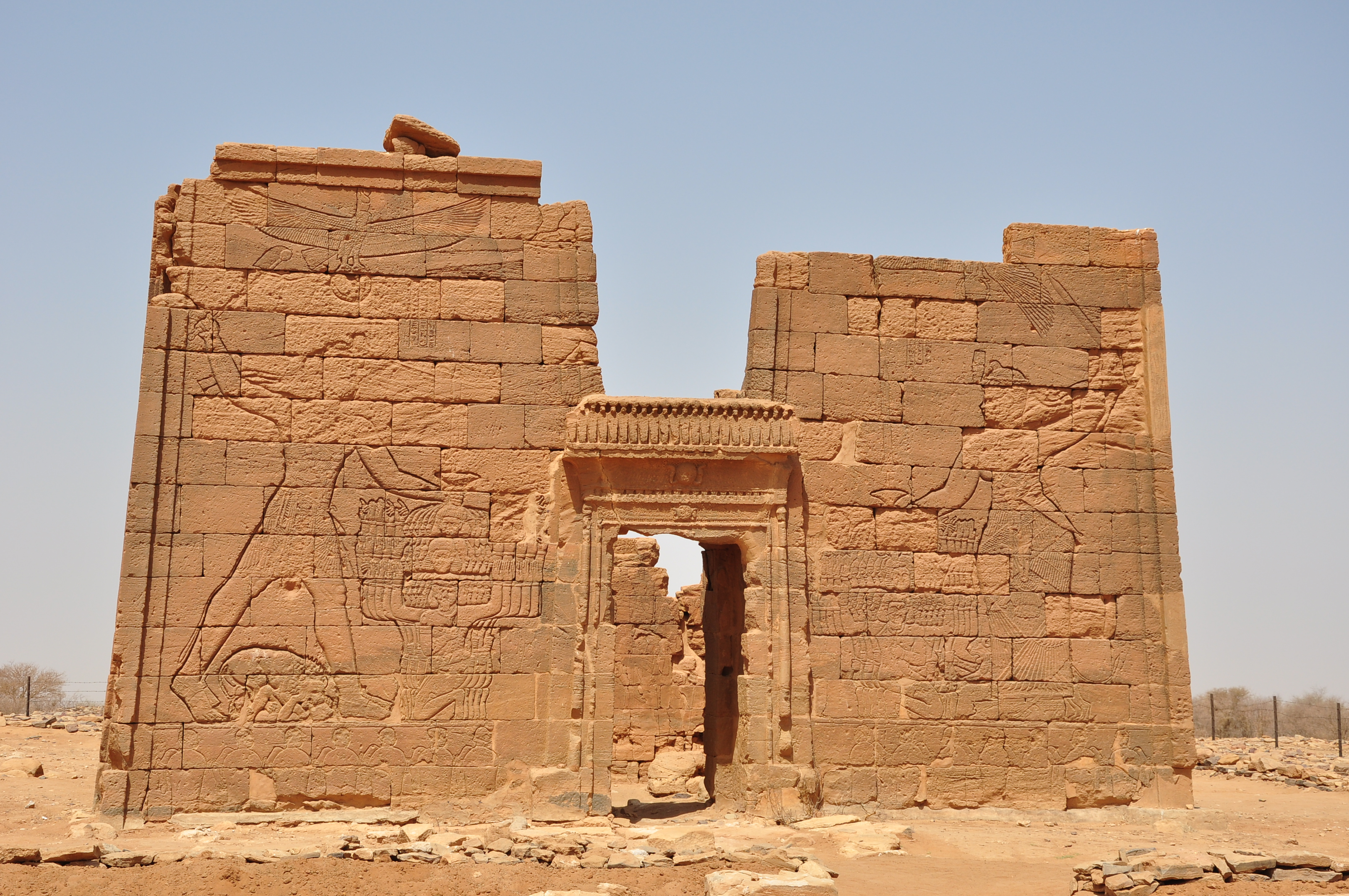
Temple of Apedemak in Naqa. Pylons depicting King Natakamani and Queen Amanitore smiting enemies. The queen holds a sword, the king an axe.

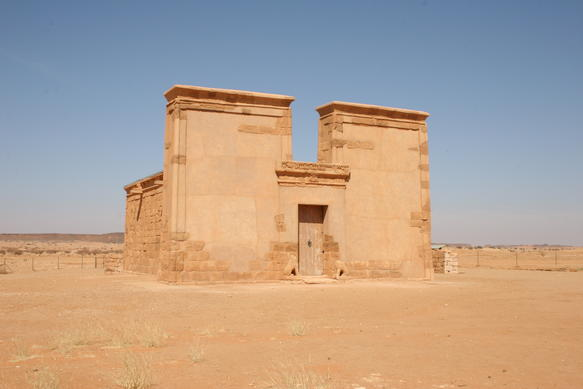
Temple of Apedemak in Musawwarat es-Sufra, built by Arnekhamani

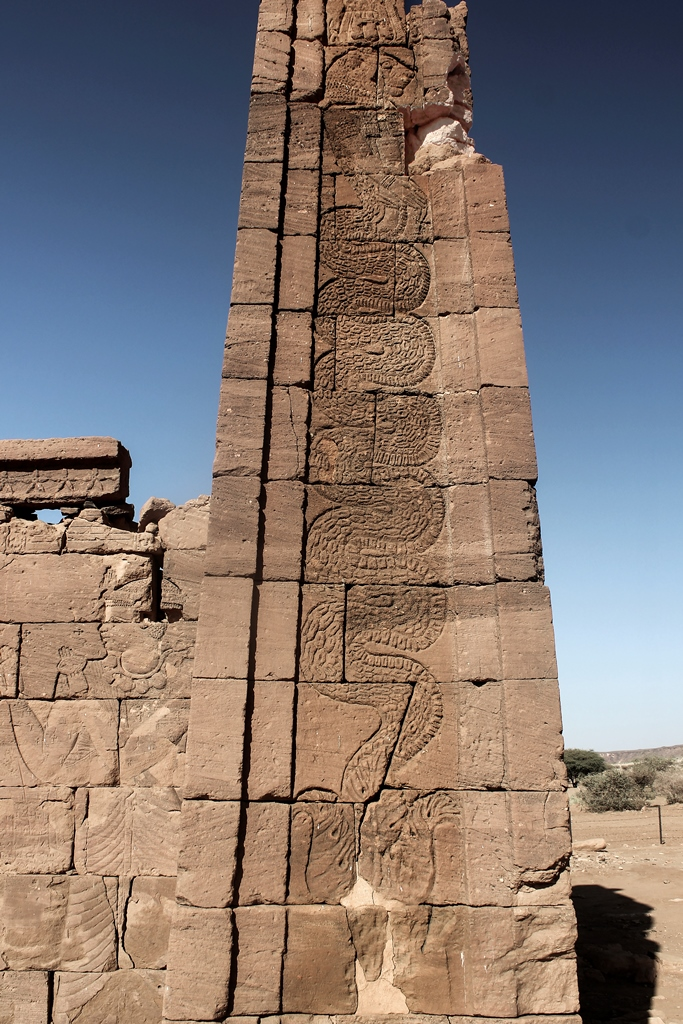
Lion Temple of Naqa: Apedemak represented as a coiled snake with lion's head

== See also ==
- Solar deity
- Narasimha
