= Amanikhareqerem =

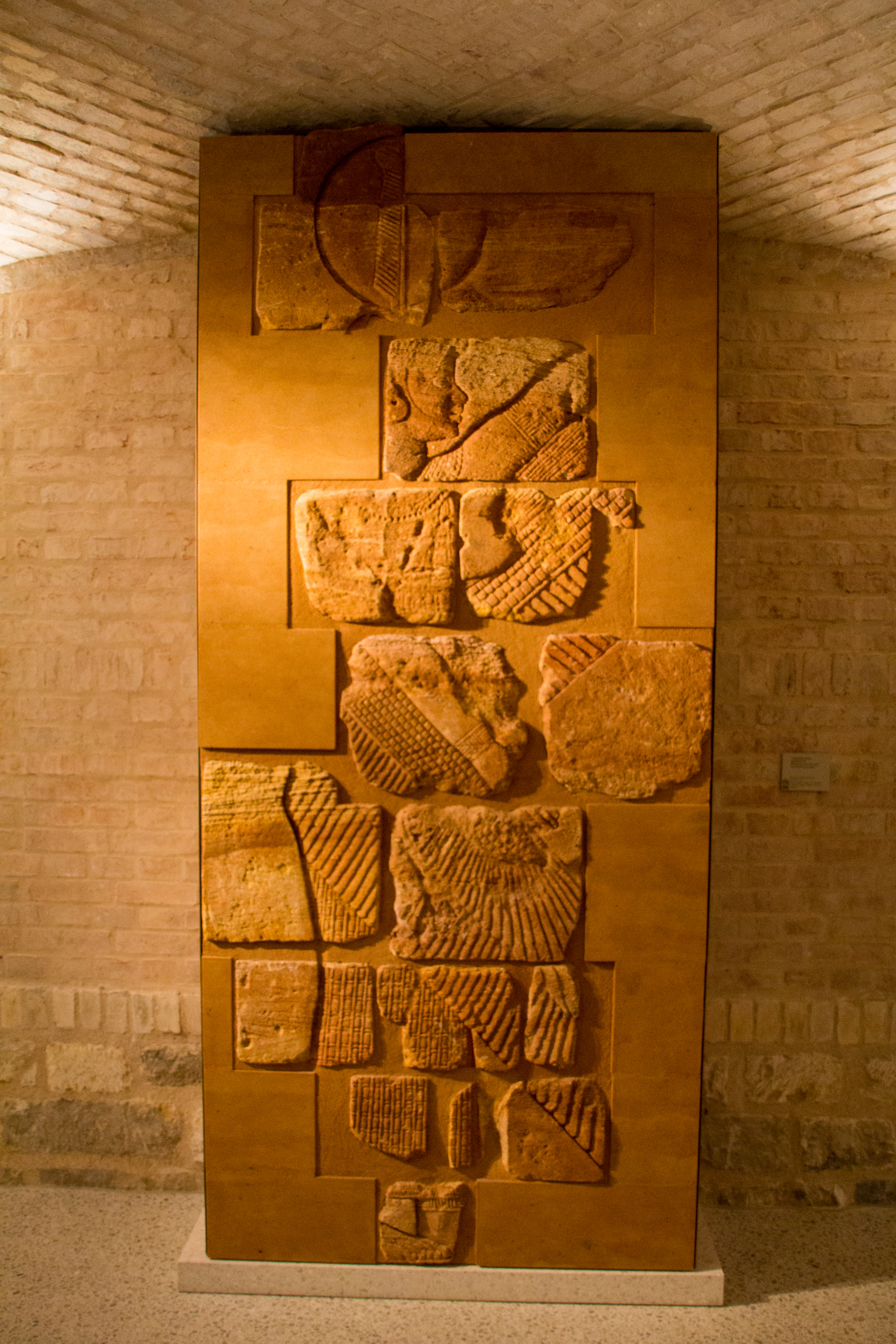
- Temple decoration at Naqa, made in the reign of Amanikhareqerem

Kushite King of Meroë
- Reign: Late 1st century AD
- Predecessor: Shorkaror (?)
- Successor: Amanitenmemide (?)
Royal titulary
- Burial: Pyramid Beg. N 16 (?) at Meroë

Amanikhareqerem was a King of Kush who ruled during the late 1st century AD. In older research he was placed into the 2nd century AD. or possibly earlier. His chronological position means that he may have succeeded Shorkaror and preceded Amanitenmemide. It is impossible to securely identify where Amanikhareqerem was buried. It has been suggested that he was buried in the pyramid Beg. N 16 in Meroë.

Until recently not much was known about Amanikhareqerem. His name only appeared on two ram figures and an object found at Napata. In recent years new excavations at Naqa provided more evidence for him. In 1998, a sandstone medallion with his name was found and recently a temple decoration with his name was excavated at the same place.
