= Amanitore =

Queen of Kush (1st century CE)

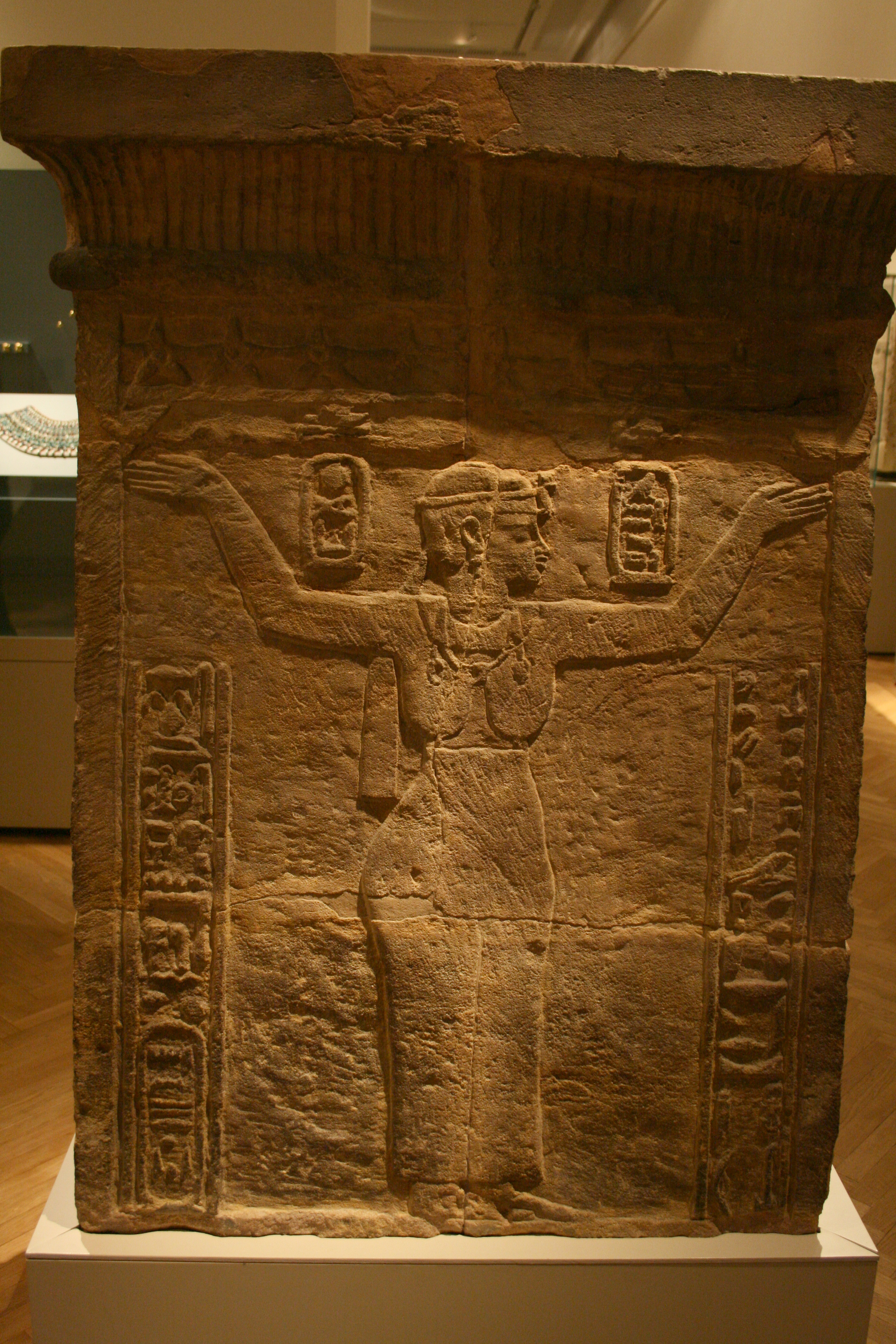
- Amanitore at Wad ban Naqa

Kushite Queen of Meroë
- Reign: Middle 1st century AD
- Coregency: Natakamani (son)
- Predecessor: Amanikhabale (?)
- Successor: Shorkaror
Royal titulary
Prenomen
Merkare

M23 X1 L2 X1	ra mr kA
Nomen
Amanitore
in Egyptian hieroglyphs

G39 N5	i mn n a r i t H8 i
- Children: Natakamani
- Burial: Pyramid at Meroë (Beg. N 1)

Amanitore, also spelled Amanitere or Amanitare, was a queen regnant of the Kingdom of Kush, ruling from Meroë in the middle of the 1st century AD. She ruled together with her son, Natakamani. The co-reign of Amanitore and Natakamani is a very well attested period and appears to have been a prosperous time. They may have been contemporaries of the emperor Nero.

== Life ==
Amanitore and Natakamani are known from their tombs and from numerous monuments where the two are depicted together. Older scholars assumed that Amanitore was Natakamani's wife, although they are now assumed to have been mother and son, because an ancient graffito found at the Temple of Dakka suggests that Amanitore was Natakamani's mother.

During their co-reign, only Natakamani was explicitly titled as ruler (qore), with Amanitore being titled as kandake (queen consort/mother). They are however clearly depicted as co-rulers with equal power given that both are shown with the regalia and attire of kings. Neither Natakamani nor Amanitore are ever attested to have ruled on their own without the other. Amanitore is buried in her own pyramid in Meroë, Beg. N 1. The tomb is approximately six metres square at its base, and not a pyramid in the mathematical sense.

Amanitore's royal palace was at Jebel Barkal in modern-day Sudan, which now is a UNESCO heritage site. The area of her rule was between the Nile and the Atbara rivers.

Three crown princes are attested in Amanitore and Natakamani's co-reign: Arikhankharer, Arikakahtani, and Shorkaror. Both Arikhankharer and Arikakahtani are believed to have predeceased Natakamani and Amanitore since only Shorkaror is attested to have become king. The familial relationship between the princes and Natakamani and Amanitore is unknown. Amanitore and Natakamani may based on their chronological position have been preceded by Amanikhabale. They were succeeded by Shorkaror.

== Construction projects ==
Amanitore was among the last Kush builders. She was involved in restoring the large temple for Amun at Meroë and the Amun temple at Napata after it was demolished by the Romans. Reservoirs for the retention of water also were constructed at Meroë during her reign. The two rulers also built Amun temples at Naqa and Amara.

The quantity of building that was completed during the middle part of the first century indicates that this was the most prosperous time in Meroitic history. More than two hundred Nubian pyramids were built, most plundered in ancient times.

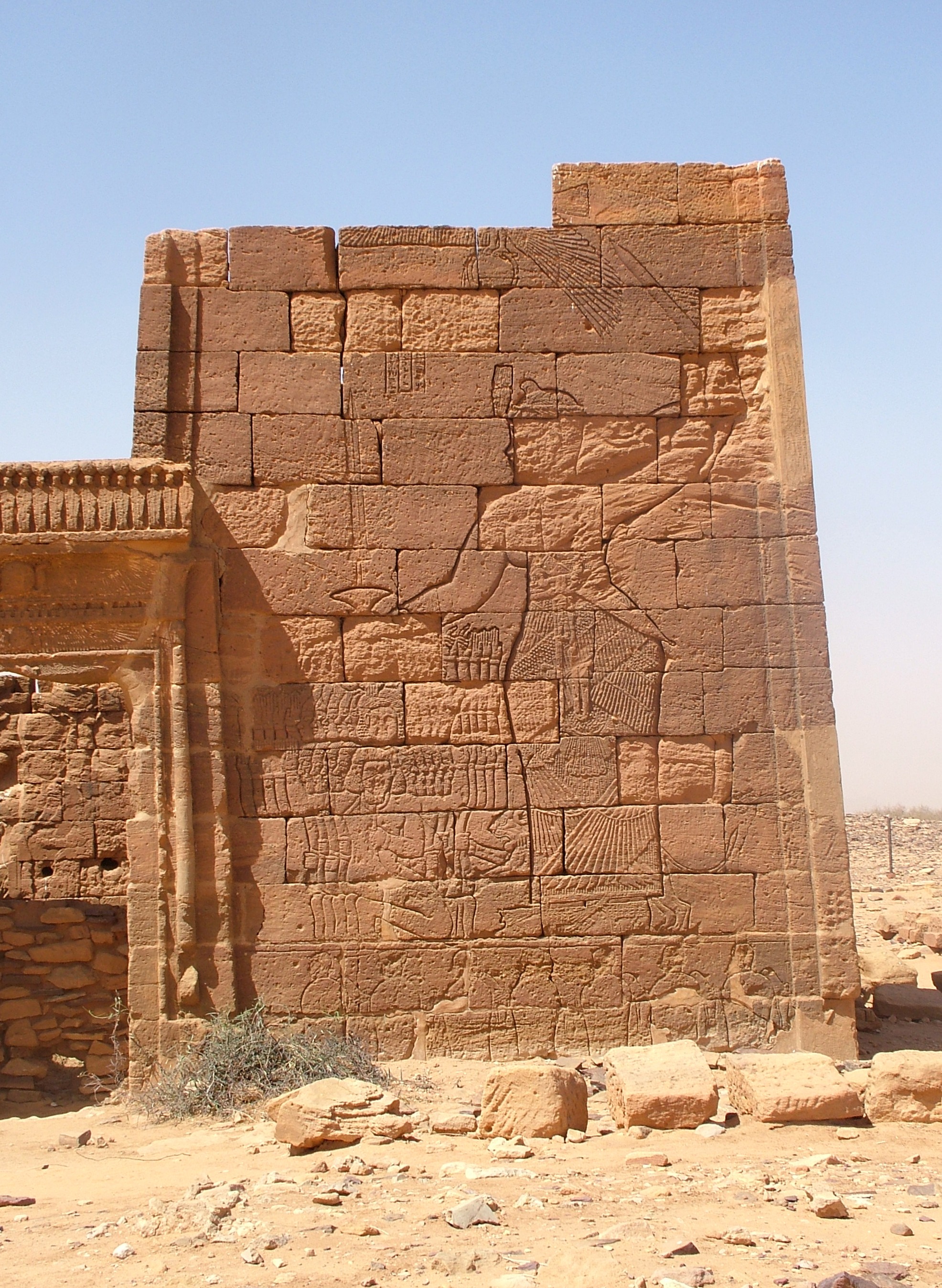
Queen Amanitore quashing her enemies

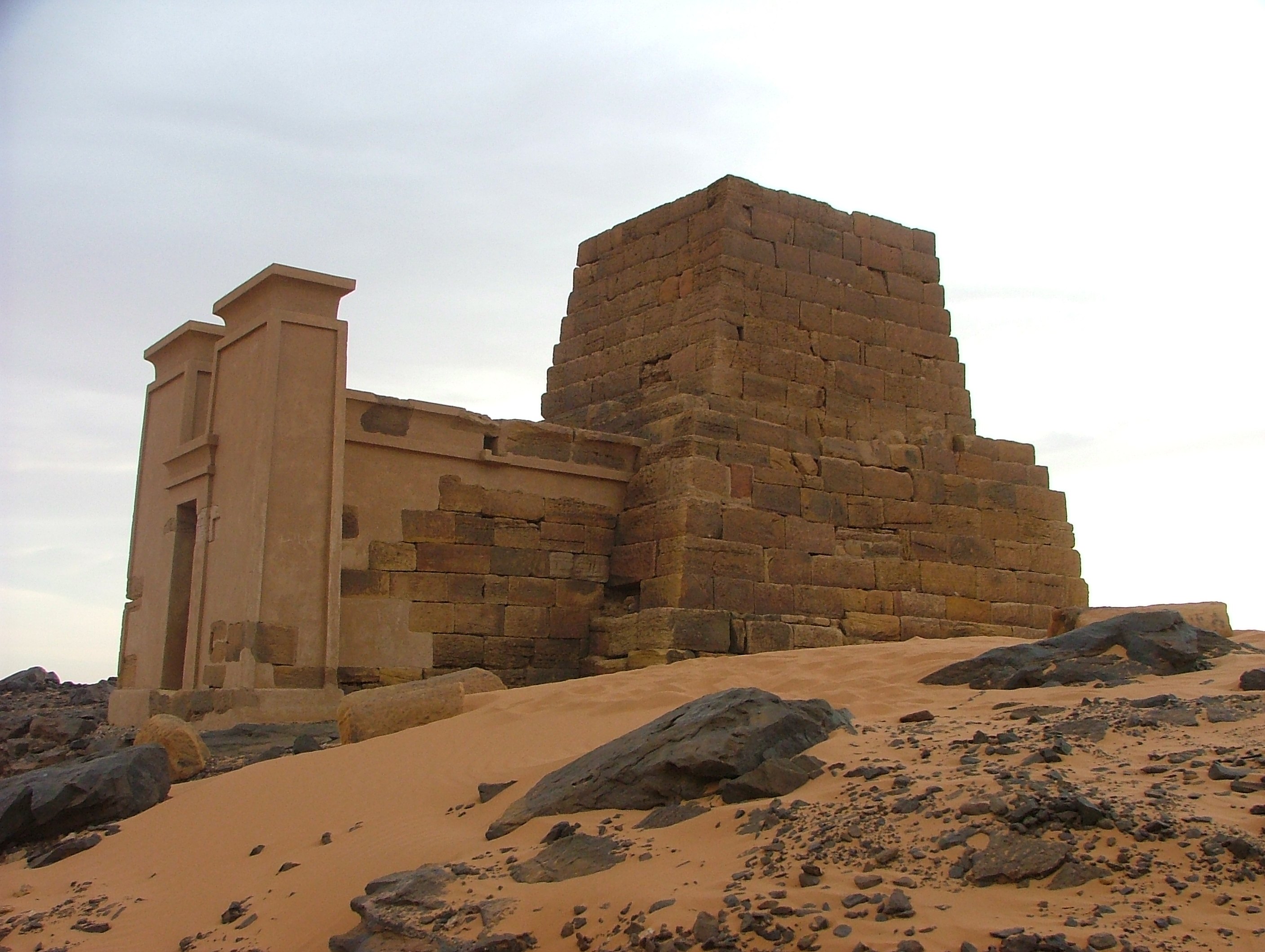
Pyramid of Amanitore in Meroë

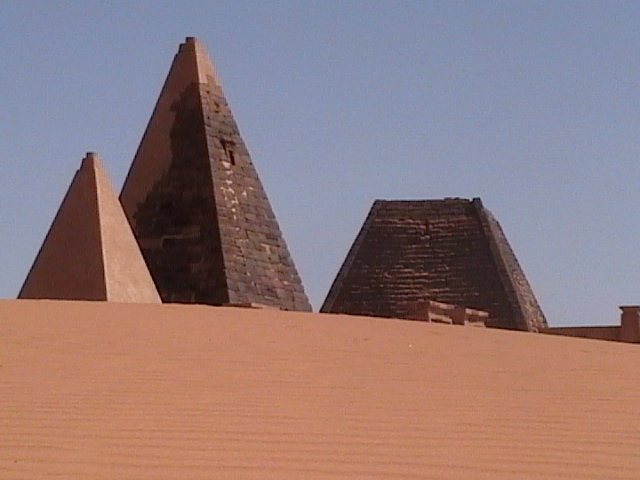
Pyramids built in Meroë differed significantly from those of the Ancient Egyptians

== New Testament ==
Amanitore may be the kandake mentioned in the Bible in the story about the conversion of the Ethiopian in Acts 8:26–40:

And the angel of the Lord spoke to Philip, saying, Get up, and go toward the south unto the way that goes down from Jerusalem to Gaza, which is desert. And he got up and went: and, behold, a man of Ethiopia, a eunuch of great authority under Candace queen of the Ethiopians, who had the charge of all her treasure, and had come to Jerusalem to worship, was returning, and sitting in his chariot read Isaiah the prophet….
