= Naqa =

Ruined ancient city in Sudan, a UNESCO World Heritage Site

- 𐦶𐦬𐦲𐦵 (Meroitic) ٱلـنَّـقْـعَـة (Arabic)
- Naga'a
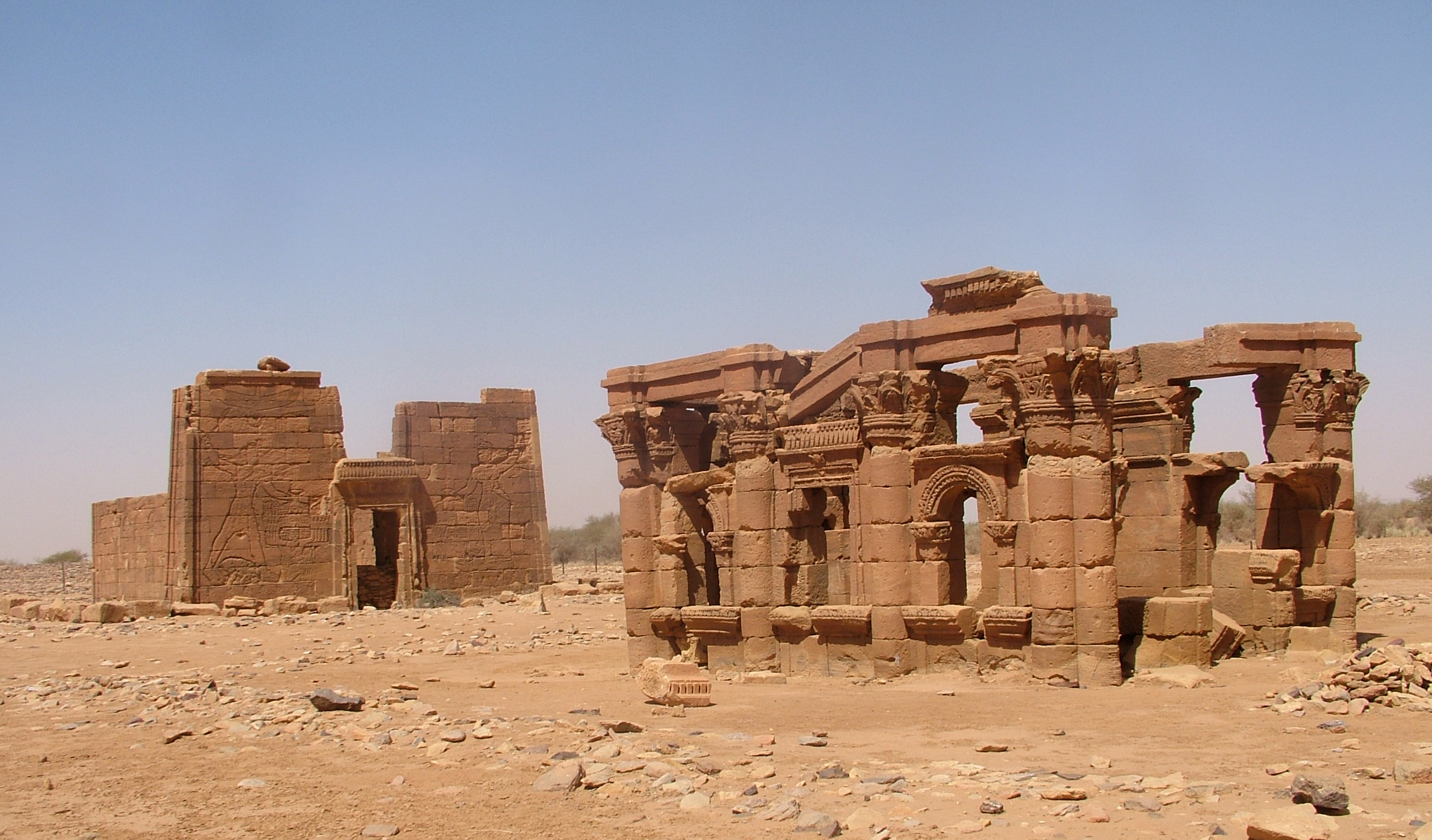
- The Roman Kiosk and the Temple of Apedemak

- Location within Sudan Naqa (Africa) Naqa (Earth)
- 16°16′10″N 33°16′30″E
- Type: Sanctuary
- Location: River Nile, Sudan
- Region: Nubia

UNESCO World Heritage Site
- Official name: Archaeological sites of the Island of Meroe
- Type: Cultural
- Criteria: ii, iii, iv, v
- Designated: 2011 (35th session)
- Reference no.: 1336
- Region: Africa

Naqa or Naga'a (Meroitic: 𐦶𐦬𐦲𐦵, romanized: Tolakate; Arabic: ٱلـنَّـقْـعَـة, romanized: An-Naqʿah) is a ruined ancient city of the Kushite Kingdom of Meroë in modern-day Sudan. The ancient city lies about 170 km (110 miles) north-east of Khartoum, and about 50 km (31 miles) east of the Nile River. Here smaller wadis meet the Wadi Awateib coming from the center of the Butana plateau region, and further north at Wad ban Naqa from where it joins the Nile. Naqa was only a camel or donkey's journey from the Nile, and could serve as a trading station on the way to the east; thus it had strategic importance.

Naqa is one of the largest ruined sites in the country and indicates an important ancient city once stood in the location. It was one of the centers of the Kingdom of Meroë, which served as a bridge between the Mediterranean world and Africa. The site has two notable temples, one devoted to Amun and the other to Apedemak which also has a Roman kiosk nearby. With Meroë and Musawwarat es-Sufra it is known as the Island of Meroe, and was listed as a UNESCO World Heritage Site in 2011.

== Research ==
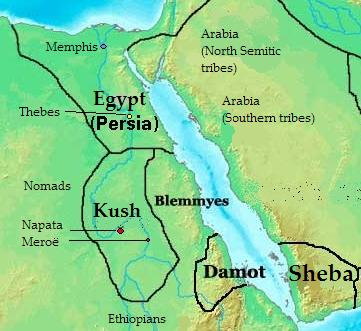
Location of the Kingdom of Kush, 4th century BC

The first European travellers reached Naqa in 1822, before Hermann von Pückler-Muskau did in 1837. In 1843, it was visited by Richard Lepsius and his Prussian Egypt-Sudan expedition. He copied some of the inscriptions and representations of the temple standing here. In 1958 a team from Berlin's Humboldt University visited Naqa and documented the temple and restored part of the site along with the nearby site of Musawwarat es-Sufra in the 1960s.

Since 1995, Naqa has been excavated by a German-Polish team with the participation of the Egyptian Museum of Berlin and the Prussian Cultural Heritage Foundation. It is directed by Professor Dietrich Wildung and is financed by the German Research Foundation (Deutsche Forschungsgemeinschaft) and also includes Polish archaeologist Professor Lech Krzyżaniak, and a small group of Polish archaeologists from Poznań. Krzyżaniak later received the Grand Officer of the Order of the Two Niles in 2002 for his work.

== Structure ==
Naqa comprises several Meroitic temples dating to 4th century BC to 4th century AD. The remains of various temples were found, but the two largest and most significant temples of Naqa are the Amun and Apedemak temples, also known as the Temple of the Lion. Both are still well preserved.

=== Temple of Amun ===
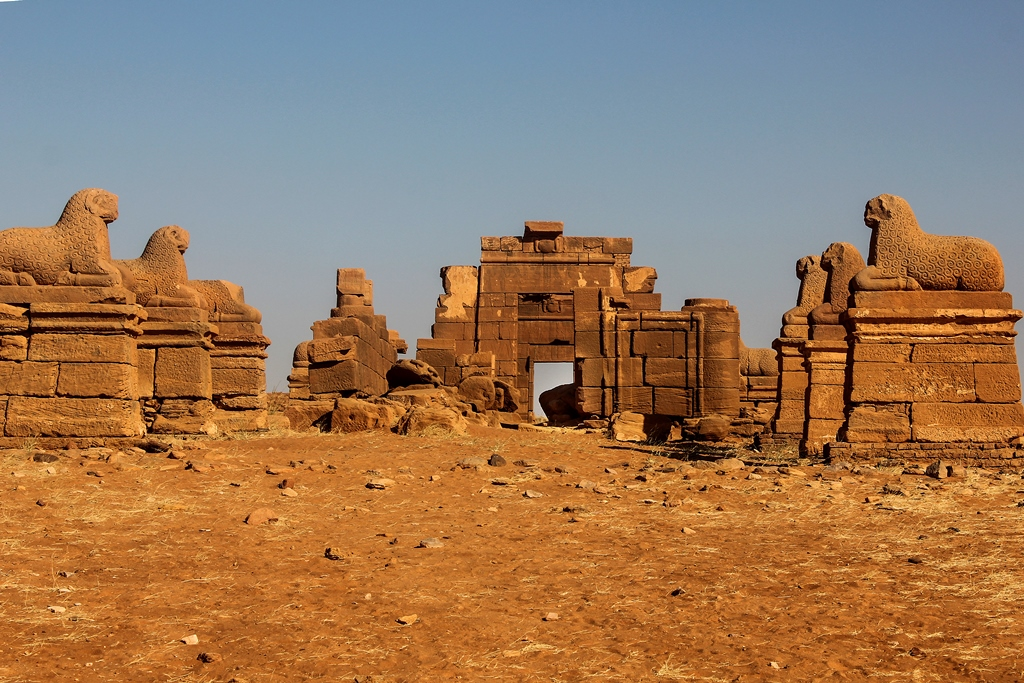
Amun temple of Naqa

The Amun temple of Naqa was founded by King Natakamani and is 100 metres in length and has several statues of the ruler. The temple is aligned on an east-west axis and is made of sandstone, which has been somewhat eroded by the wind. The temple is designed in the Egyptian style, with an outer court and colonnade of rams similar to the Temple of Amun at Jebel Barkal and Karnak, and leads to a hypostyle hall containing the inner sanctuary (naos). The main entrances and walls of the temple contain relief carvings.

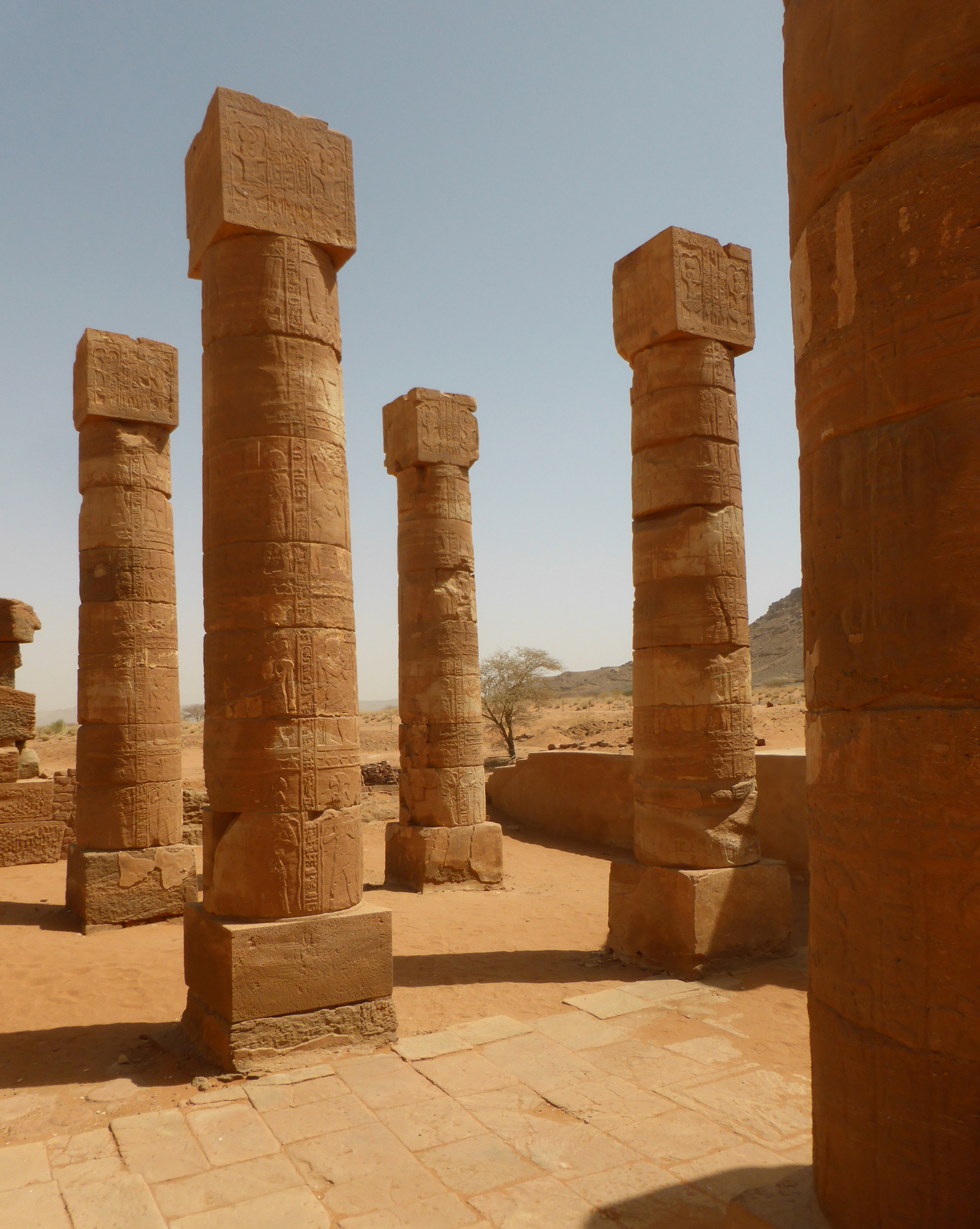
Columns of the Amun temple

In 1999 the German-Polish archaeology team explored the area of the inner sanctuary of the temple. The reverse and sides of the stela contain undeciphered Meroitic hieroglyphs and is considered by the discovery team to be one of the best examples of Meroitic art found to date. After excavation, reconstruction and measurement of the temple of Amun for over a decade, on 1 December 2006, the Sudanese authorities regained management, giving responsibility to the Ministry of Culture.

Another Amun temple named Naqa 200 and located on the slope of the nearby Gebel Naqa, the mountain overlooking the settlement of Naqa, has been excavated since 2004. It was built by Amanikhareqerem and is similar to the Temple of Natakamani and is dated to the 2nd or 3rd century AD, although some finds do not correspond to the precise dating, adding to an already fuzzy understanding of Nubian chronology.

=== Temple of Apedemak ===
Located to the west of the temple of Amun is the temple of Apedemak (or the Lion Temple). Apedemak was a lion-headed warrior god worshipped in Nubia. The god was used as a sacred guardian of the deceased hereditary chief, prince or king. Anyone who touched the chief's grave was said to be cursed by this Apedemak.

The temple is considered a classic example of Kushite architecture. The front of the temple is an extensive gateway, and depicts Natakamani and Amanitore on the left and right exerting divine power over their prisoners, symbolically with lions at their feet. Who the prisoners are exactly is unclear, although historical records have revealed that the Kushites frequently clashed with invading desert clans. Towards the edges are fine representations of Apedemak who is represented by a snake emerging from a lotus flower. On the sides of the temple are depictions of the gods Amun, Horus and Apedemak keeping company in the presence of the king. On the rear wall of the temple is the largest depiction of the lion god, and is illustrated receiving offering from the king and queen. He is depicted as a three-headed god with four arms. The north-front shows the goddesses Isis, Mut, Hathor, Amesemi and Satet.

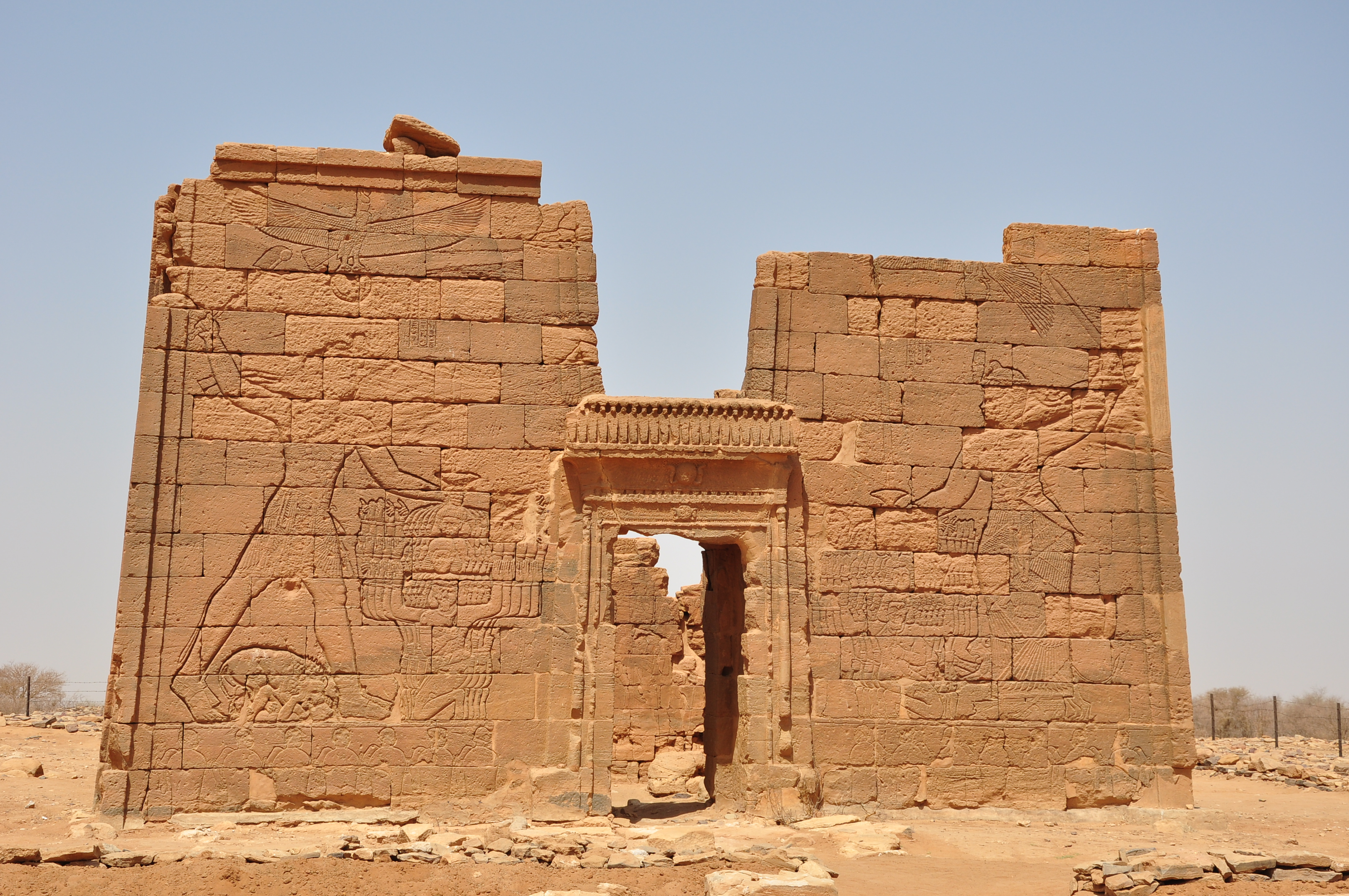
Pylons depicting King Natakamani and Queen Amanitore smiting enemies. The queen holds a sword, the king an axe

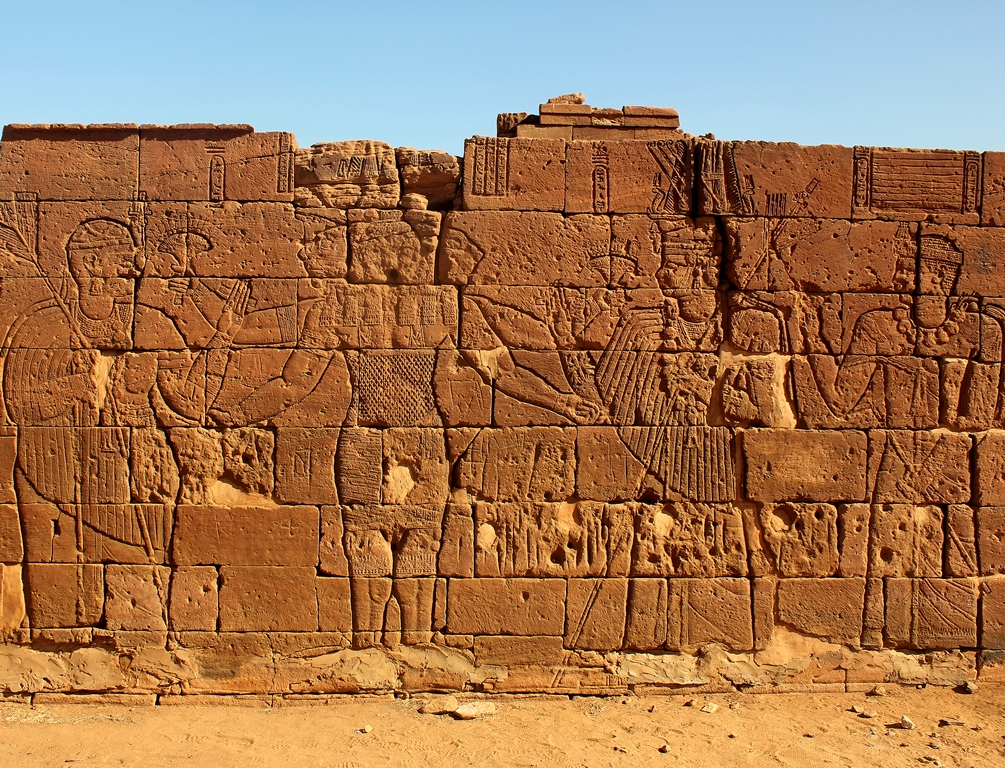
Three-headed Apedemak with four arms

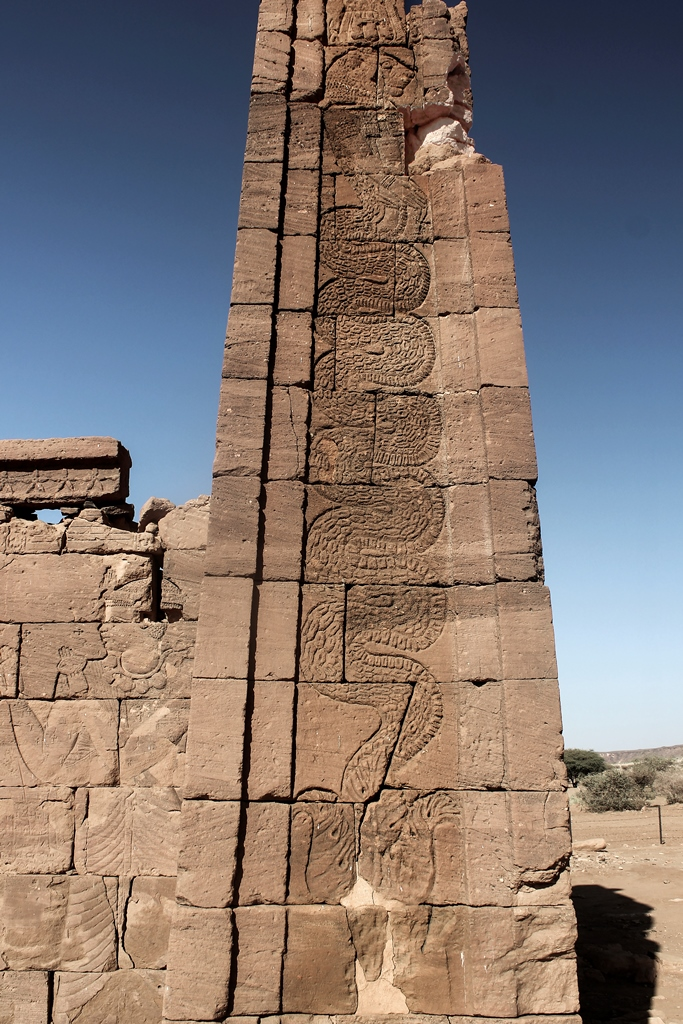
Apedemak as a coiled snake with lion’s head

==== Roman kiosk ====
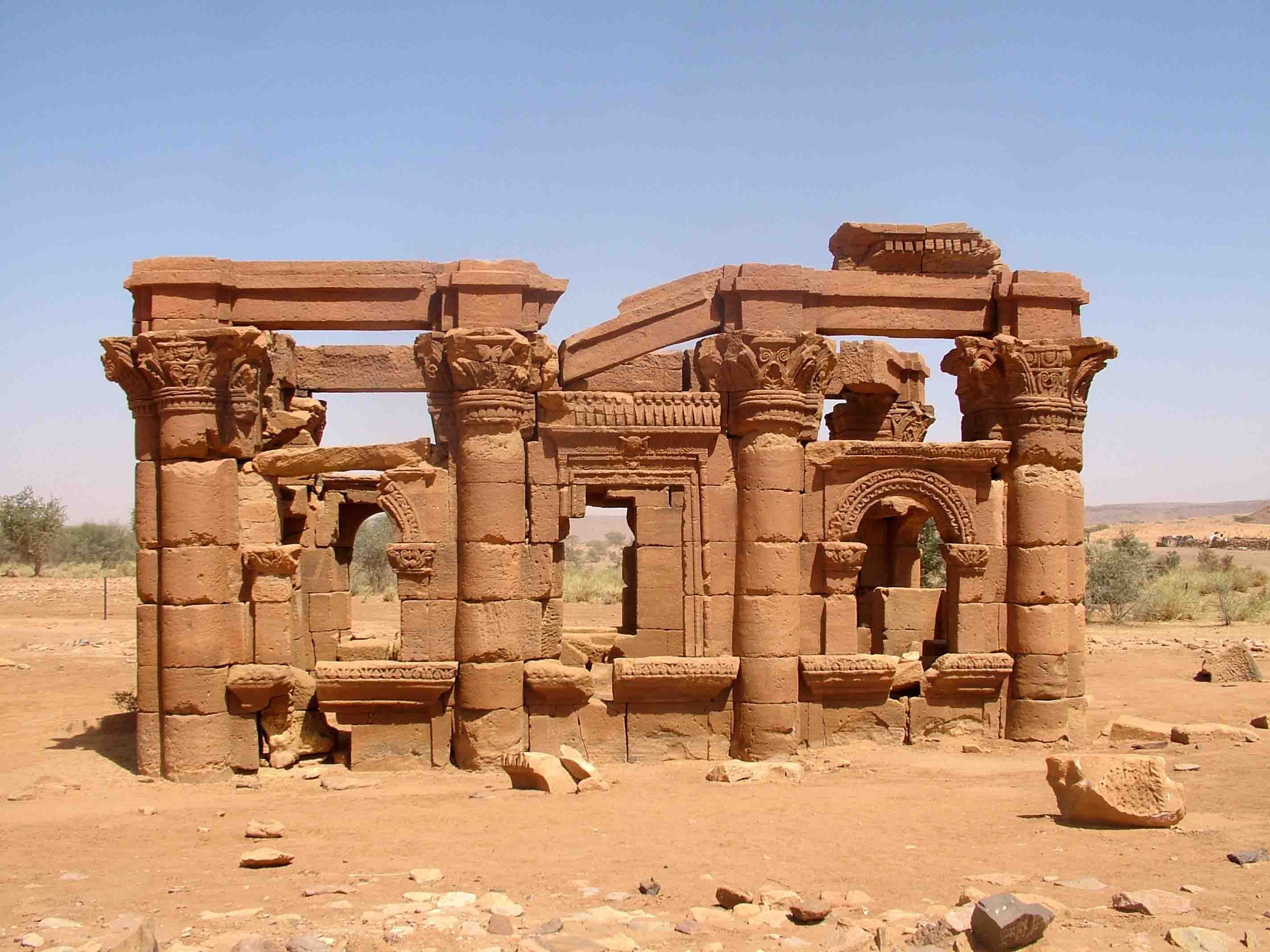
Roman kiosk

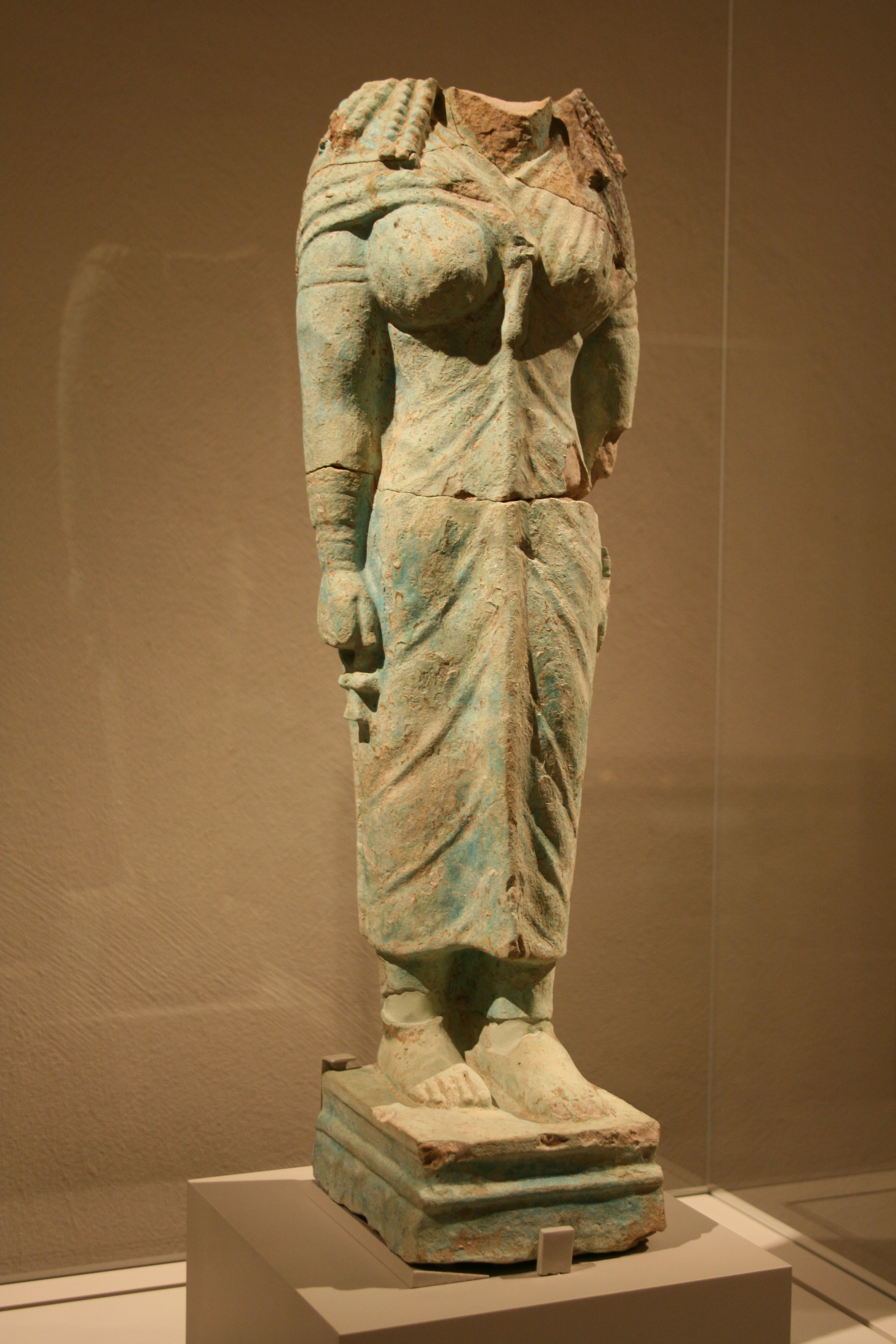
Statue of Isis found at Naqa, now on display in the Egyptian Museum of Berlin

The Roman kiosk is a small temple near the main temple building, which has strong Greco-Roman Hellenistic elements. The entrance to the kiosk is Egyptian and is topped by a lintel with a row of sacred uraeus (cobras) but the sides consist of columns with florid Corinthian capitals and arched windows in the Roman style. Recent excavations at the building showed that it was probably devoted to the worship of Hathor. The goddess Isis was known to have absorbed some characteristics of Hathor.

== Other ==
Standing at the foot of the sandstone cliffs of Jabal Naqa is the temple named "500". It was built by Shanakdakhete around 135 BC, making it the oldest building on the site. The texts on the temple walls are the oldest known writings in Meroitic hieroglyphs. Judging by the reliefs, the temple was dedicated to the Theban triad of Amun, Mut, and Khonsu, as well as Apedemak. In 1834, Giuseppe Ferlini discovered treasure which was severely damaged. A thorough excavation and restoration has been made since.

== See also ==
- Northeast Africa

== Literature ==
- Dietrich Wildung; Karla Kroeper (2006), Naga - Royal City of Ancient Sudan (in German), Berlin: Staatliche Museen zu Berlin - Stiftung Preußischer Kulturbesitz, ISBN 3-88609-558-4
- Basil Davidson Old Africa Rediscovered, Gollancz, 1959
- Peter Shinnie Meroe, 1967
