= Natakamani =

Kushite King

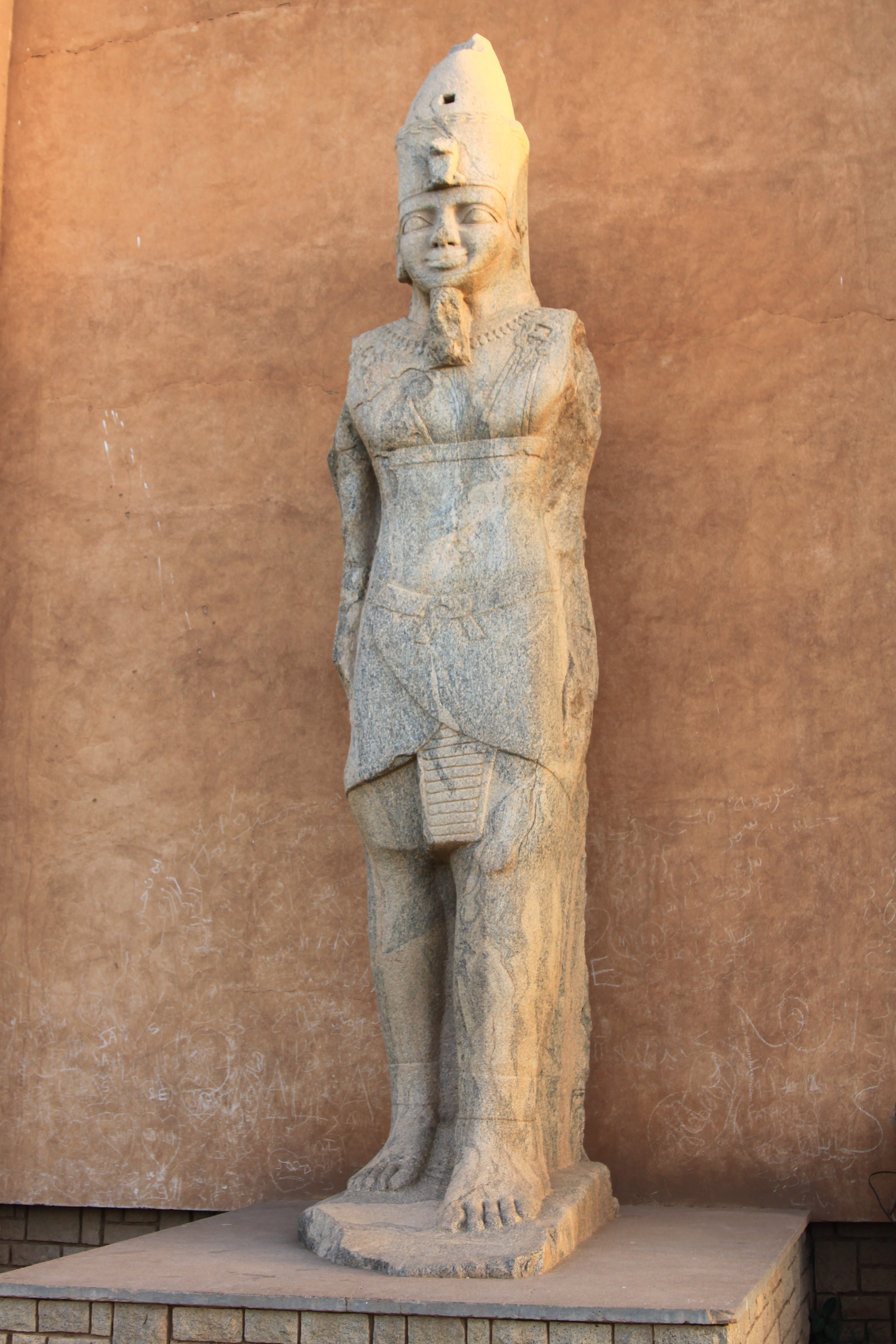
- Statue of Natakamani, Argo Island, Tabo Temple, c. 60 CE

Kushite King of Meroë
- Reign: Middle 1st century
- Coregency: Amanitore (mother)
- Predecessor: Amanikhabale (?)
- Successor: Shorkaror
Royal titulary

Natakamani, also called Aqrakamani, was a king of Kush who reigned from Meroë in the middle of the 1st century CE. He ruled as co-regent together with his mother Amanitore. Natakamani is the best attested ruler of the Meroitic period. He and Amanitore may have been contemporaries of the Roman emperor Nero.

== Monumental remains ==
Natakamani is known from several temple buildings and from his pyramid in Meroe. He is also known for restoring the temple of Amun, as well as his dedication of the temple at Faras.

On several monuments Natakamani appears together with his co-regent, Queen Amanitore. The only one of the two explicitly titled as ruler (qore) is Natakamani, with Amanitore being titled only as kandake (queen consort/mother). They are however clearly depicted as co-rulers with equal power given that both are shown with the regalia and attire of kings. Neither Natakamani nor Amanitore are ever attested to have ruled on their own without the other. Surviving inscriptions do not make the exact relationship between Natakamani and Amanitore clear. Older scholarship conventionally assumed that they were husband and wife, though they are now mostly believed to have been mother and son. An ancient graffito found at the Temple of Dakka strongly suggests that Amanitore was Natakamani's mother.

Three crown princes are attested in Natakamani's and Amanitore's co-reign: Arikhankharer, Arikakahtani, and Shorkaror. At the temple of Apedemak there is a relief showing Natakamani with the crown prince Arikhankharer. Both Arikhankharer and Arikakahtani are believed to have predeceased Natakamani and Amanitore since only Shorkaror is attested to have become king. The familial relationship between the princes and Natakamani and Amanitore is unknown.

Their reign of Natakamani and Amanitore appears to have been a very prosperous period. They were preceded by Amanikhabale and succeeded by Shorkaror. "Aqrakamani", a royal name known only from a Demotic inscription at Dakka, was previously believed to be a distinct king and was traditionally dated to the first century BC. Recent studies have however demonstrated that Aqrakamani was the same person as Natakamani.

== Historical images ==
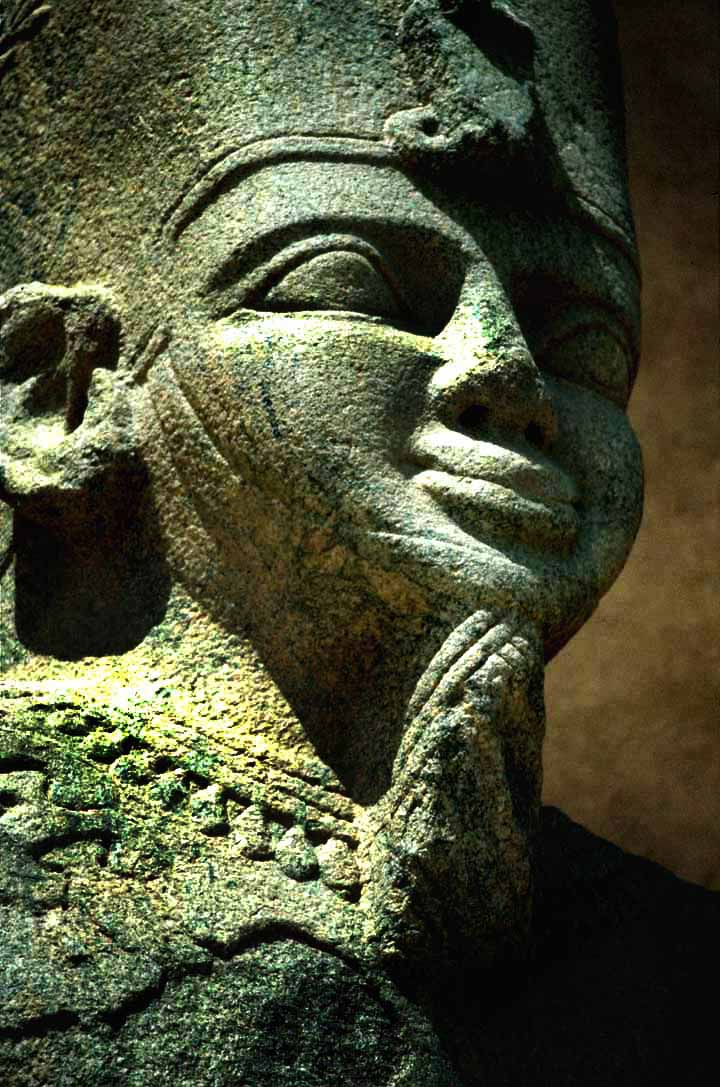
A statue that may depict Natakamani

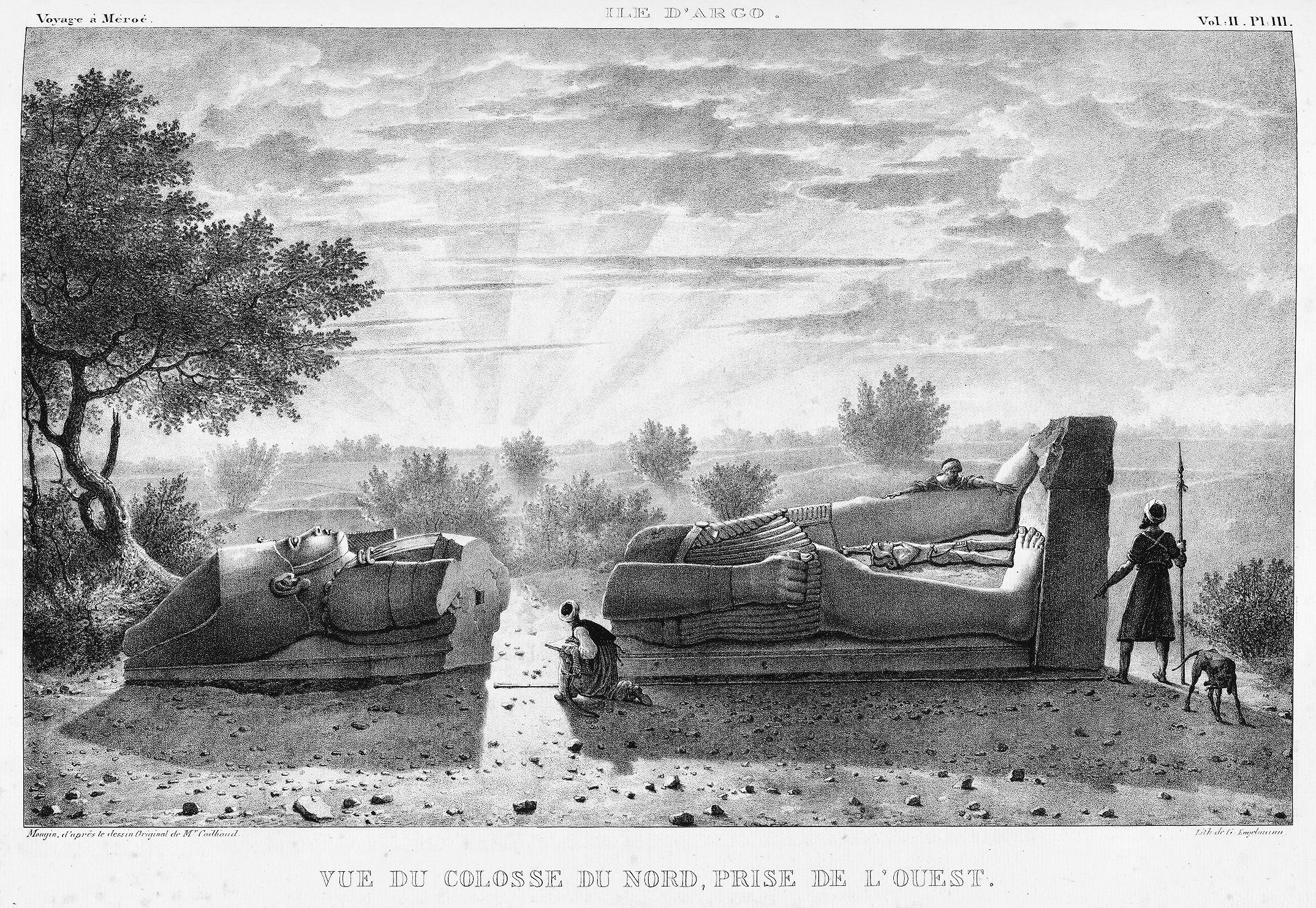
Monumental Natakamani statue, as found in 1821

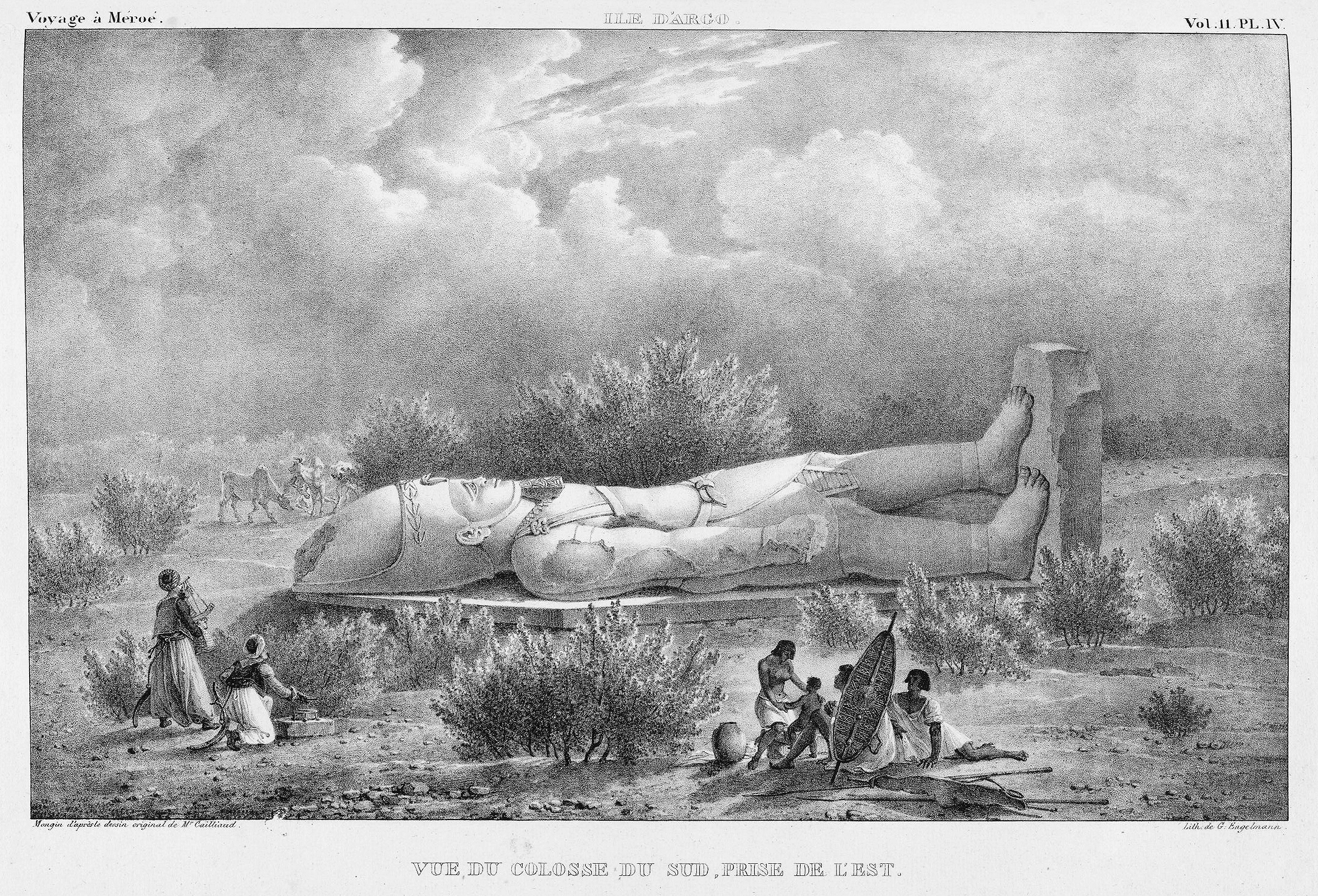
Another statue of Natakamani, as found in 1821

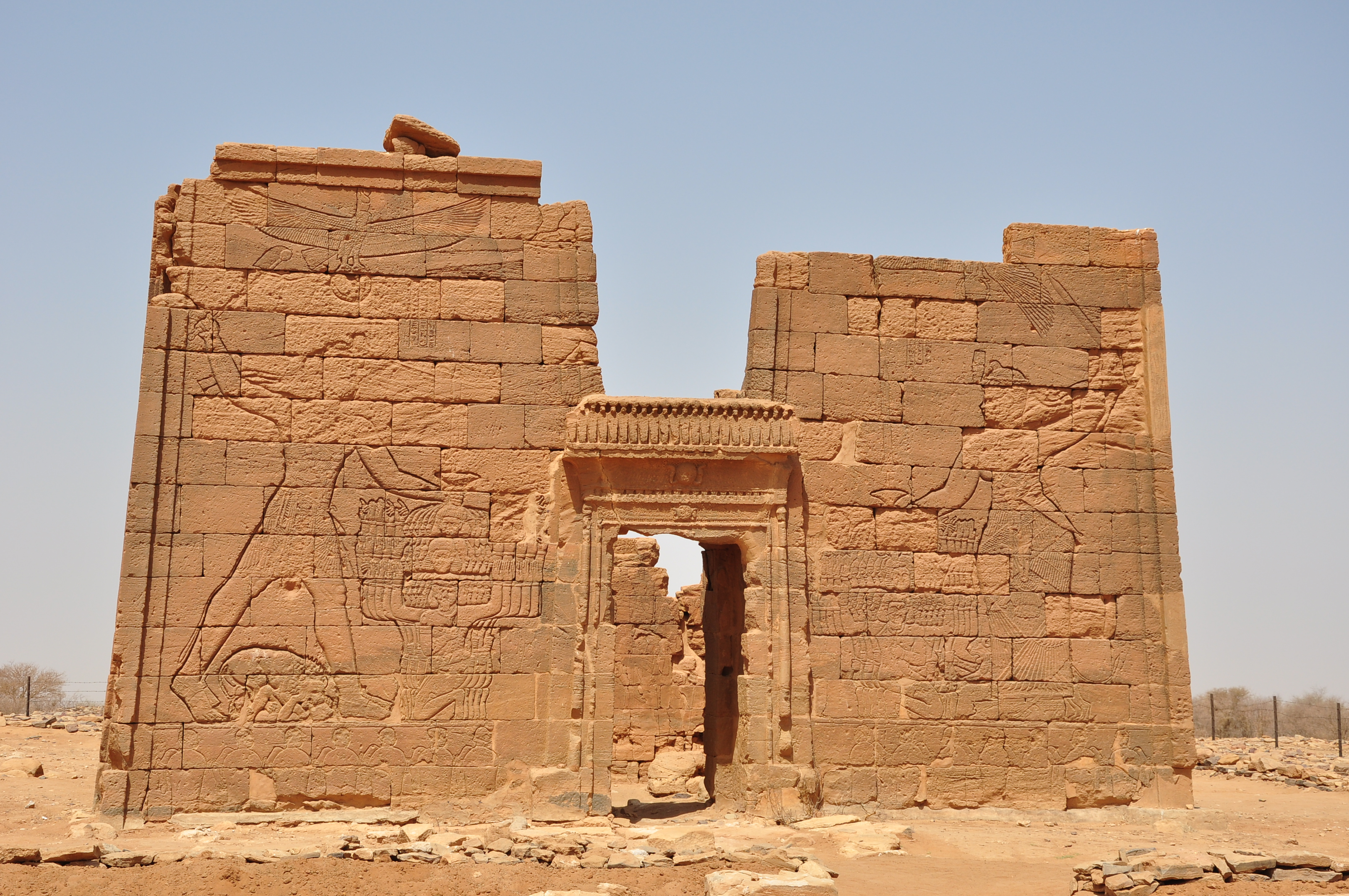
Pylons depicting King Natakamani and Queen Amanitore smiting enemies. The queen holds a sword, the king an axe. Apademak Temple in Naqa.

== See also ==
- List of monarchs of Kush
