= Nubian pyramids =

Pyramids built by ancient Kushite kingdoms in present-day northern Sudan

- Nubian pyramids
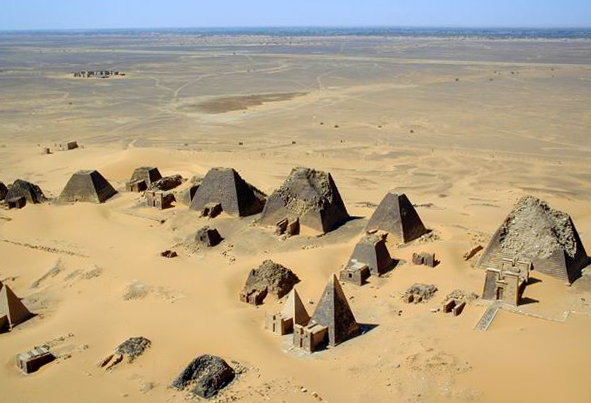
- Aerial view of the pyramids of Meroë

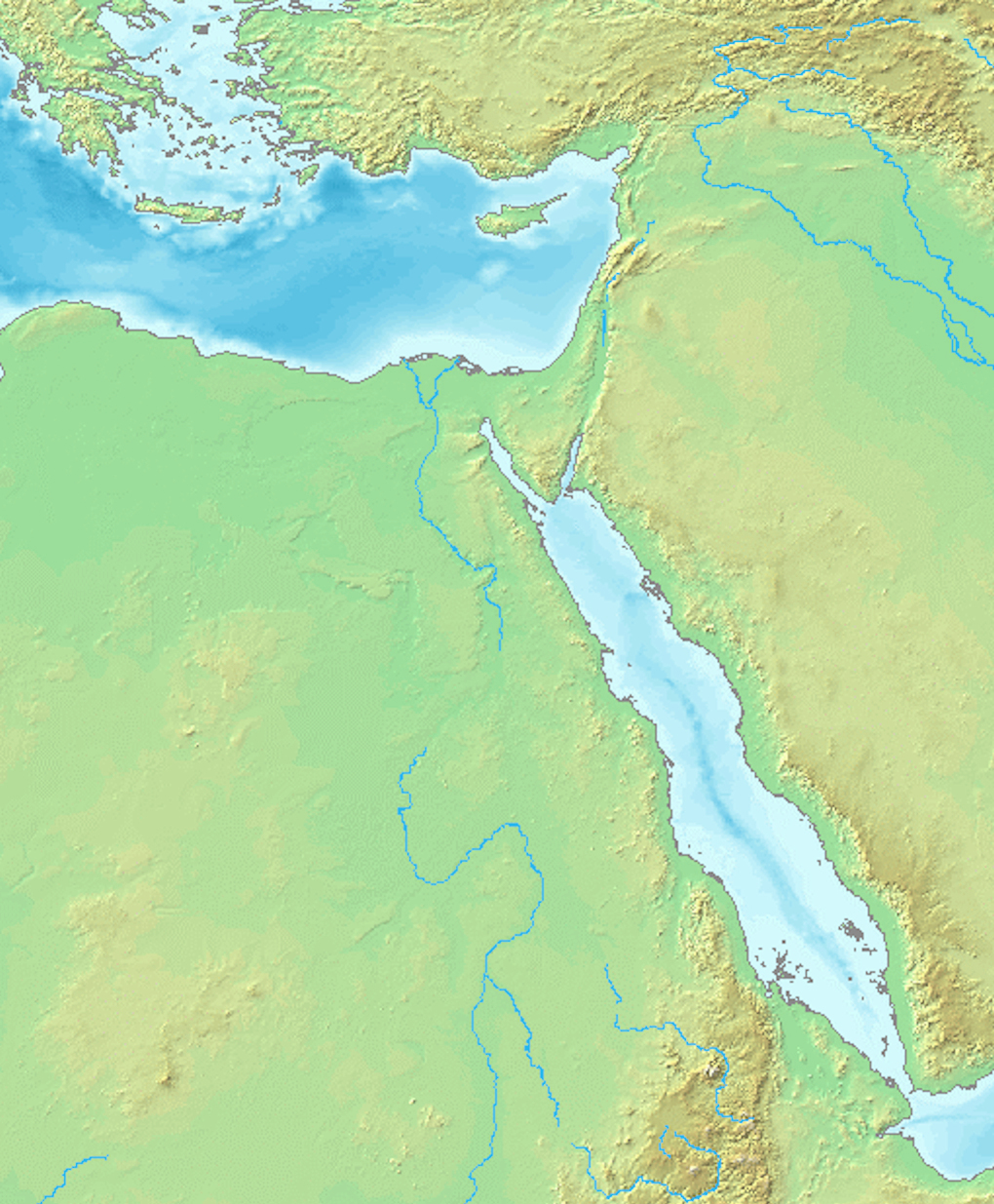
- Location of Nubian pyramids
- 16°56′15″N 33°44′55″E
- Type: Pyramids
- Location: Sudan

History
- Built: 750 BC – 350 AD

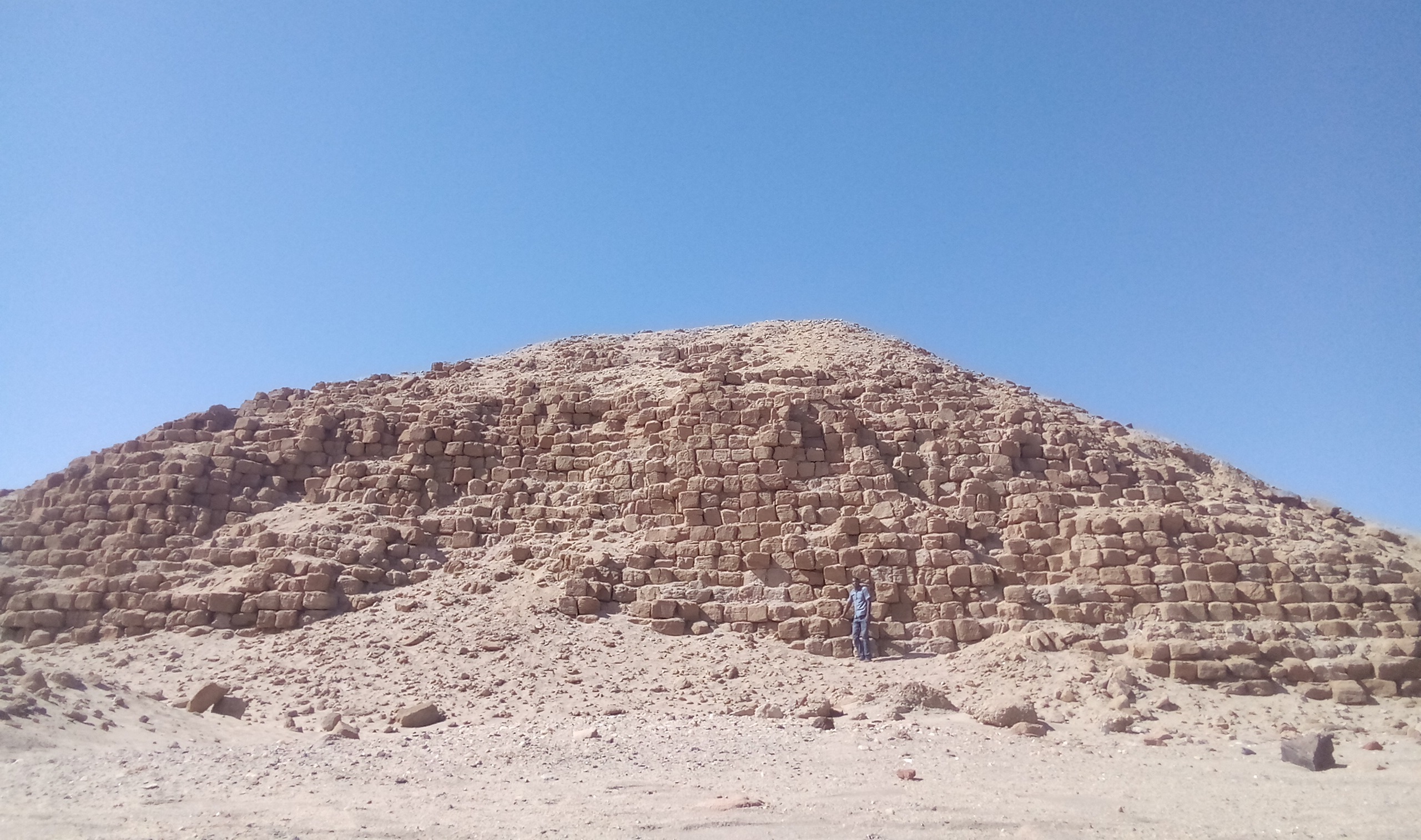
Pyramid of Taharqa at Nuri, 51.75m in side length and possibly as much as 50m high, was the largest built in Sudan.

The Nubian pyramids were constructed by the rulers of the ancient Kushite kingdoms in the region of the Nile Valley known as Nubia, located in present-day northern Sudan. This area was the site of three ancient Kushite kingdoms. The capital of the first was at Kerma (2500–1500 BC), the second was centered on Napata (1000–300 BC) and the third was centered on Meroë (300 BC – 300 AD).

In Nubian culture, the pyramids were integral to burial customs for royalty and other wealthy figures of the Kushite kingdom, with this practice starting as early as the 7th century BC. These customs endured for almost a thousand years from 700 BC to 350 AD. The Nubian pyramids display adaptations of Egyptian architecture that were prevalent during the New Kingdom. Notably these are a UNESCO World Heritage Site.

== Chronology and organization of Nubian burial sites ==
The Nubian pyramids were built over a period of a few hundred years to serve as tombs for the kings and queens and wealthy citizens of Napata and Meroë. The four main sites in which these pyramids hold prominence are El-Kurru, Nuri, Jebel Barkal, and Meroe. The first three sites are located around Napata in Lower Nubia, near the modern town of Karima.

The earliest pyramids in El Kurru were constructed in 751 BC, which formed the center of the Empire of Kush during the Napatan period, ca. 850-300 BC. It is recognized as the origin of the tombs belonging to the rulers of Egypt and Nubia's 25th Dynasty, c. 750–664 BC, along with their ancestors. The tradition of building royal Kushite pyramids is believed to have originated from King Piankhy. This burial tradition was continued by Piye's successor Shabataka, Shabaka. and Tanwetamani.

Later these pyramids begin to be built 26 kilometers upstream from El-Kurru at the site of Nuri which contains burials from 670-310 BC. The earliest burial at Nuri is accredited to King Taharqo who ruled from 690–664 BC. The oldest and largest pyramid at Nuri–and in all of Nubia–is that of the Napatan king and Twenty-fifth Dynasty pharaoh Taharqa. His tomb, standing at 160–180 feet tall, differed from other Nubian pyramids in the manner that it mirrored the tomb of Osiris, an Egyptian pyramid. The pyramid was built on the left bank of the Nile, typically the west bank representing sunset and death. However, due to the bend of the Nile at Nuri, the left bank is actually the east bank representing sunrise and rebirth. In this way, the tomb was used to associate Taharqa's passing with new beginnings and rebirth, paving the way to a new golden age with the ushering in of the next ruler. This necropolis was the burial place of 21 kings and 52 queens and princes including Anlami and Aspelta. The bodies of these kings were placed in huge granite sarcophagi. Aspelta's weighed 15.5 tons, and its lid weighed four tons.

The next burial sites appear at Jebel Barkal from late 4th century. This location was an important political and religious centre of the Kingdom of Kush, ancient Napata. The pyramids here are located beside the mountain of Jebel Barkal and consist of 25 pyramids that are split into 2 areas. The earliest pyramids at Jebel Barkal date from the beginning of the 3rd century while the second group of pyramids dates to the 1st century BC.

Eventually, the prosperity of the Nubian kingdom began to decline. Assyrians invaded Nubia, forcing Taharqa's successor to flee from Egypt. Following this, a new Egyptian dynasty formed, defeating the Nubians and regaining its independence in 593 BC In response, the capital of Nubia was moved from Napata to Meroe. Nubian rulers consequently chose to be entombed in the new capital, and a new group of pyramids was built at Meroe. The pyramids at Meroe were built beginning in 270 BC and the construction of these pyramids lasted for over 700 years. Centuries passed, until the Nubian kingdom based in Meroe collapsed. The last Nubian pyramid (and the last African pyramid) was built at Meroe around 350 AD.

== Burial methods and architecture ==
Egyptian burial methods began to adapt in Nubia during Egyptian occupation of Nubia during the New Kingdom period.

The Nubian pyramids were constructed using a combination of granite and sandstone and are closely arranged in clusters, such that a selection of two pyramids may lie within touching distance of one another. One of the tools used was shadoof counterbalanced lever hoist, of which the central pivot poles were left buried in the center of the pyramid and covered by their respective cap stones. The interior chambers were lined with plaster and decorated with scenes from the life of the deceased. The largest pyramid at Meroë is 30 metres (98 ft) high and is thought to have been built for the Nubian queen Amanishakheto.

The Nubian pyramids emulated a form of Egyptian private elite family pyramid that were common during the New Kingdom in Egypt.

In the Twenty-fifth Dynasty, with the Nubian conquest of Egypt, Nubian burial customs began to shift back towards the pyramid in Napata. The more traditional tumulus made way for the pyramid amongst Nubian royalty, but the chapels and underground burial chambers remained from the previous time period. These pyramids were inspired by Egyptian private pyramids dating back to the New Kingdom. Indeed, some burial chambers were decorated in the manner of the private pyramid.

The tombs inside the pyramids of Nubia were plundered in ancient times. Wall reliefs preserved in the tomb chapels reveal that their royal occupants were mummified, covered with jewellery and laid to rest in wooden mummy cases. At the time of their exploration by archaeologists in the 19th and 20th centuries, some pyramids were found to contain the remains of bows, quivers of arrows, archers' thumb rings, horse harnesses, wooden boxes, furniture, pottery, colored glass, metal vessels, and many other artifacts attesting to extensive Meroitic trade with Egypt and the Hellenistic world.

A pyramid excavated at Meroë included hundreds of heavy items such as large blocks decorated with rock art and 390 stones that comprised the pyramid. A cow buried complete with eye ointment was also unearthed in the area to be flooded by the Meroë Dam, as were ringing rocks that were tapped to create a melodic sound.

The pyramids of royalty and the wealthy differed significantly in various architectural aspects.

== Key distinctions between Egyptian and Nubian pyramids ==
Approximately 255 pyramids are known to have been constructed by the Nubians, more than double the number constructed in Ancient Egypt.

The physical proportions of Nubian pyramids differ markedly from the Egyptian pyramids: they are built of stepped courses of horizontally positioned stone blocks and range approximately 6–30 metres (20–98 ft) in height, but rise from fairly small foundation footprints, resulting in tall, narrow structures inclined at approximately 70°. Most also have offering temple structures abutting their base with unique Kushite characteristics. Egyptian pyramids of similar height generally had foundation footprints at least five times larger and were inclined at angles between 40–50°.

The most striking difference, however, is that while Egyptian pyramids house tombs of rulers within, Nubian pyramids are built on top of the burial chambers. This was a longtime source of confusion to archaeologists until George Reisner discovered that the entryways were filled in and concealed following the ruler's funeral. In this way, the pyramids served as elaborate tombstones, and tributes to the Egyptian way.

== Notable figures and their discoveries ==
In the 1830s Giuseppe Ferlini came to Meroe seeking treasure and raided and demolished a number of pyramids which had been found "in good conditions" by Frédéric Cailliaud just a few years earlier. At Wad ban Naqa, he leveled the pyramid N6 of the kandake Amanishakheto starting from the top, and found dozens of gold and silver jewelry pieces. Overall, he is considered responsible for the destruction of over 40 pyramids.

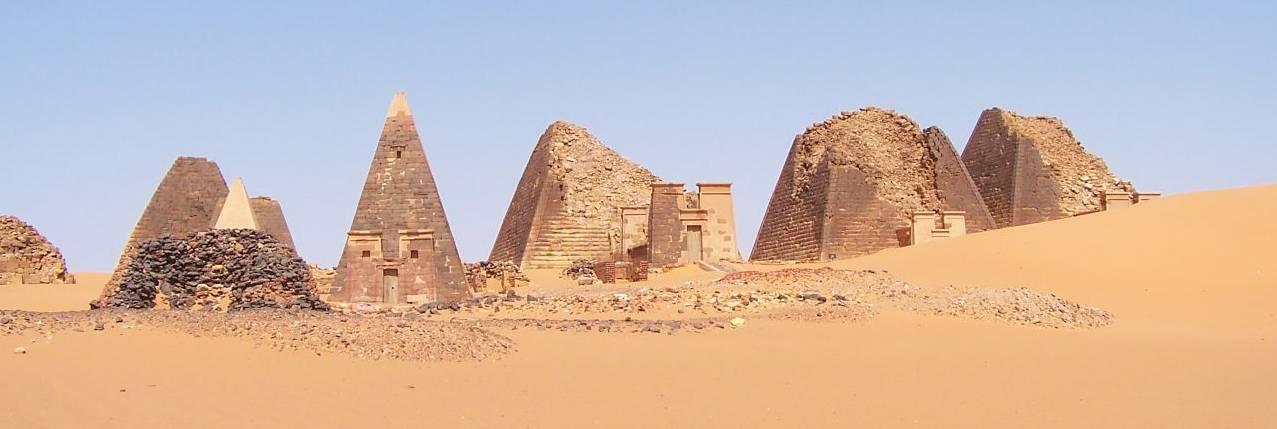
Ferlini raided the Meroe pyramids in 1834.

Ferlini returned home in 1836, having found the treasure he was looking for. A year later he wrote a report of his expedition containing a catalog of his findings, which was translated in French and republished in 1838. (Note: Giuseppe Ferlini, Relation Historique des Fouilles Operées dans la Nubia par le docteur Joseph Ferlini de Bologna, suivie d'un catalogue des objets qu'il a trouvés dans l'une des quarante-sept pyramides aux environs de l'ancienne ville de Meroe, et d'une description des grands déserts de Coruscah et de Sinnaar. Rome, 1838.) He tried to sell the treasure, but at this time nobody believed that such high quality jewellery could be made in Sub-Saharan Africa. His finds were finally sold in Germany: part of these were purchased by King Ludwig I of Bavaria and are now in the State Museum of Egyptian Art of Munich, while the remaining – under suggestions of Karl Richard Lepsius and of Christian Charles Josias von Bunsen – was bought by the Egyptian Museum of Berlin where it still is.

George Reisner, a Harvard archaeologist, investigated the pyramids at Nuri and mapped more than 80 royal Kushite burials in 1916–1919. Reisner started to explore burial chambers but he found they were flooded by the rising water table. During his excavation, a staircase collapsed and killed five of his workers. He abandoned his expedition believing it to be too dangerous. Some of his findings were published in 1955. Nonetheless, Reisner's work helped to piece together the history of an ancient kingdom, one that was previously little known outside of its biblical mentions.

National Geographic funded explorations from 2015 to 2019 using underwater scuba diving equipment and remote controlled robots.

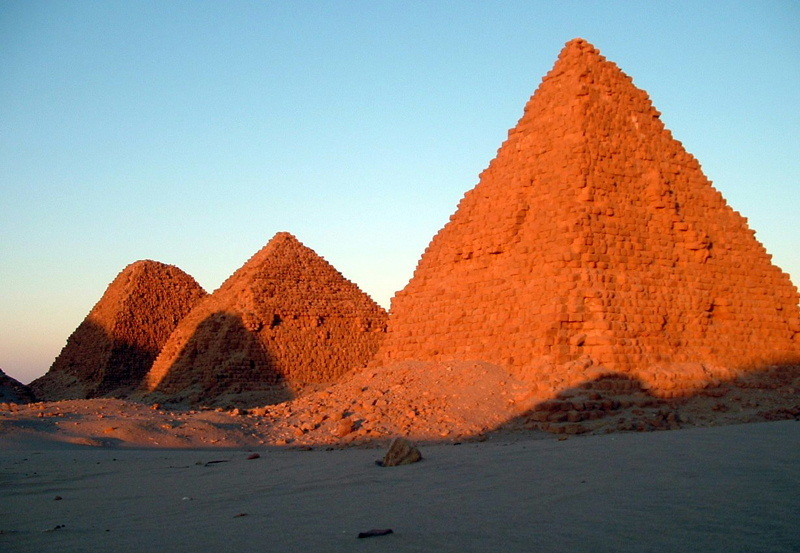
Pyramids of Nubian kings Aspelta (foreground), Aramatle-qo and Amaninatakilebte at Nuri.

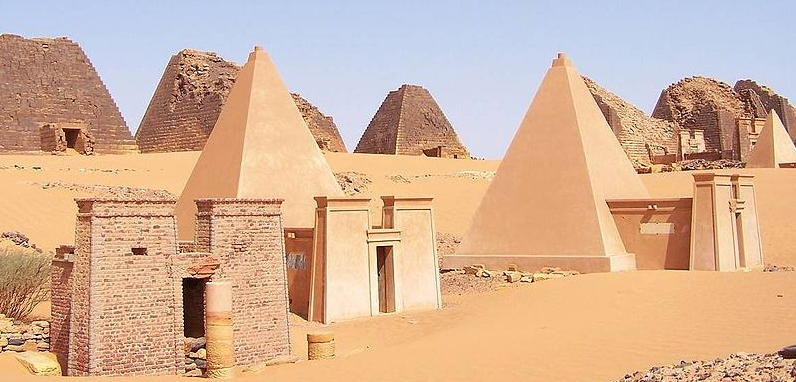
Wide view of Nubian pyramids, Meroë. Three of these pyramids are reconstructed.

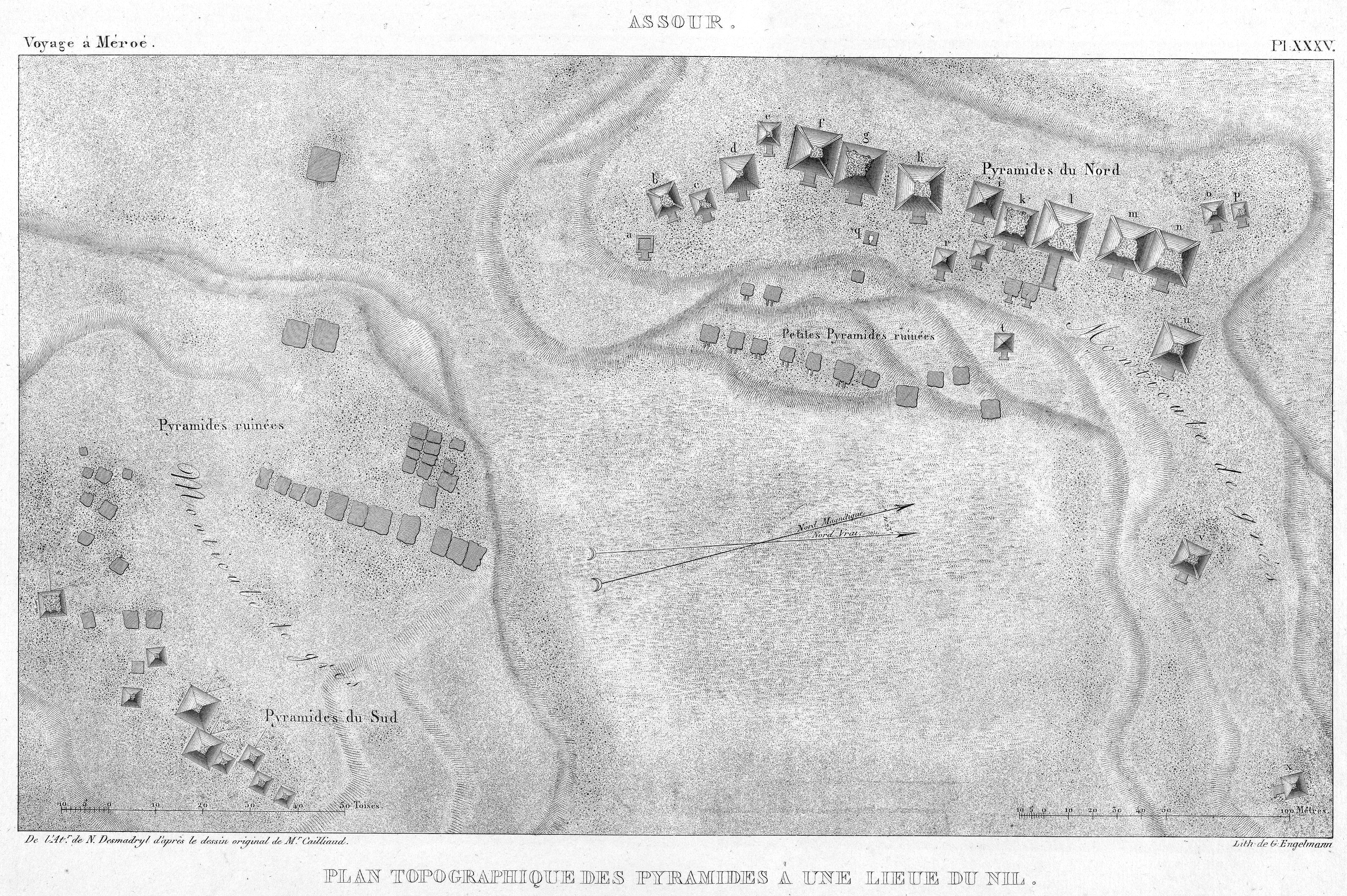
Layout of the pyramids of Meroë in 1821

Destructions
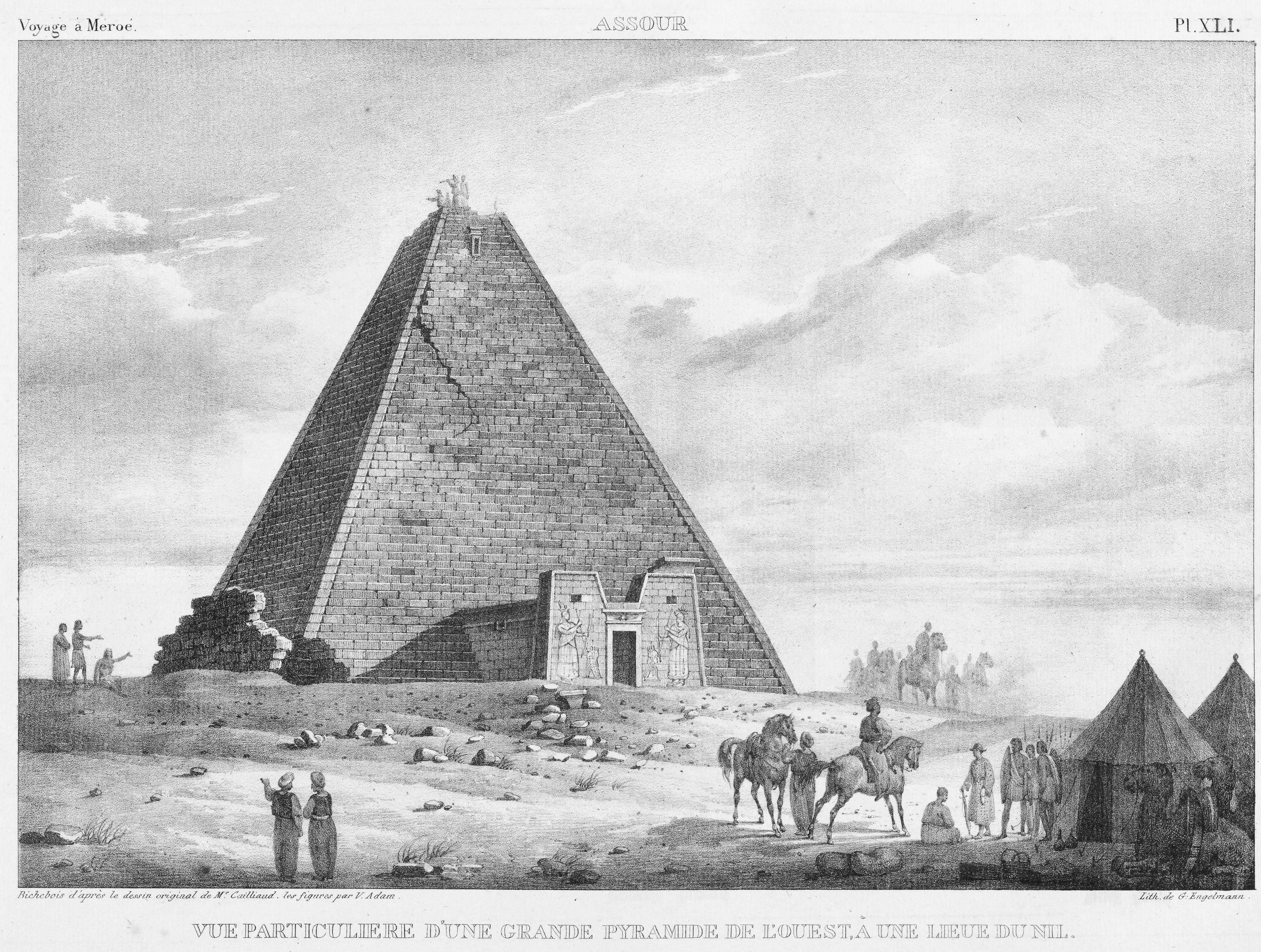
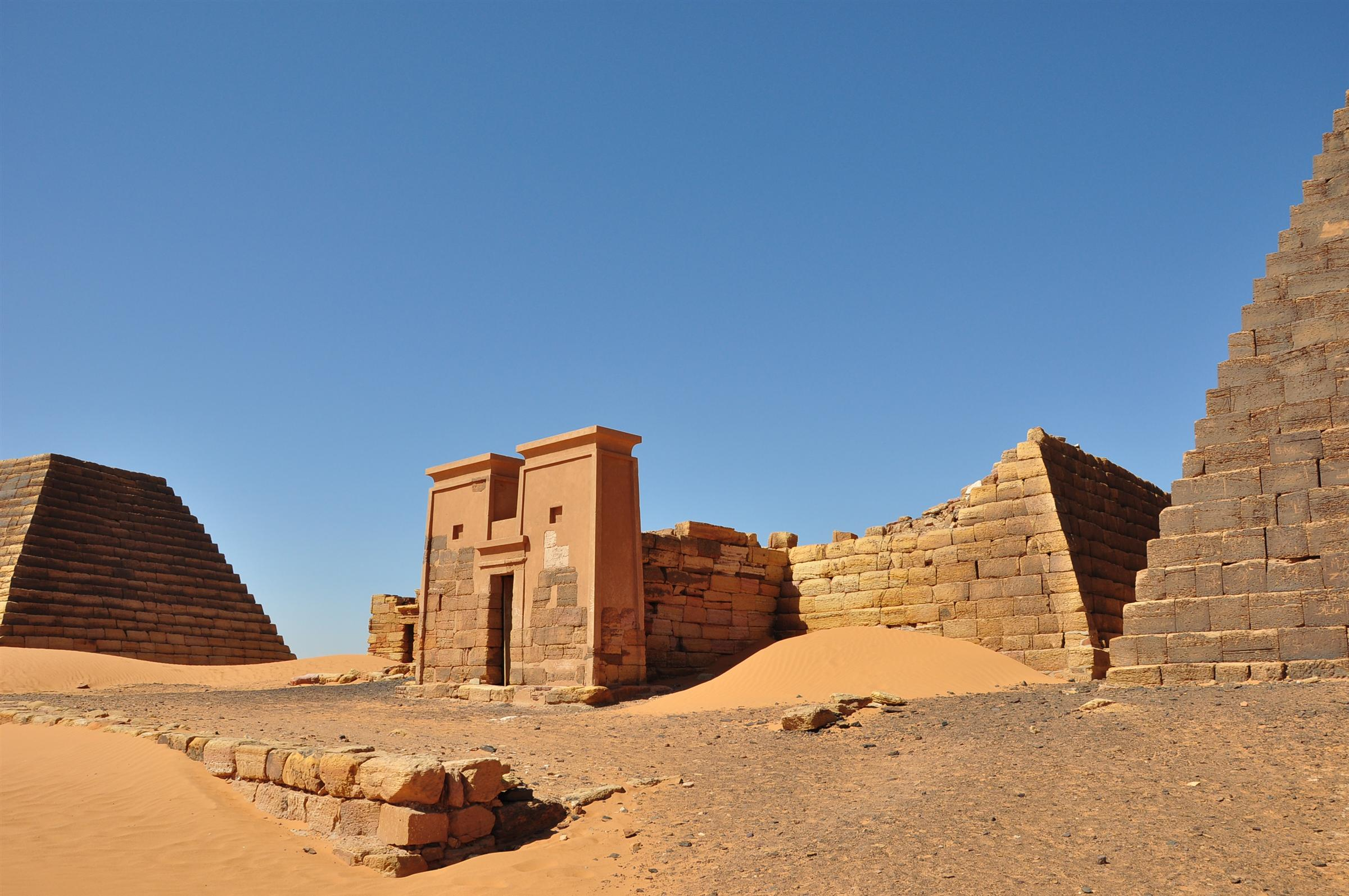
Great pyramid N6 of the Pyramids of Meroë, belonging to Queen Amanishakheto, before and after its destruction by the treasure-hunter Giuseppe Ferlini in the 1830s.

== Pyramids and cemeteries ==
- The royal cemetery at el-Kurru. Kashta, Piye, Tantamani, Shabaka and several queens are buried in pyramids at El-Kurru.
- Pyramids of Gebel Barkal
- Royal cemetery at Nuri. Kings Taharqa, Atlanersa and other royals from the kingdom of Napata are buried at Nuri.
- Pyramids of Meroe (Begarawiyah). Dating to the Meroitic period. Pyramids date from c. 720–300 BC at the South Cemetery and c. 300 BC to c. 350 AD at the North Cemetery.
- Sedeinga pyramids
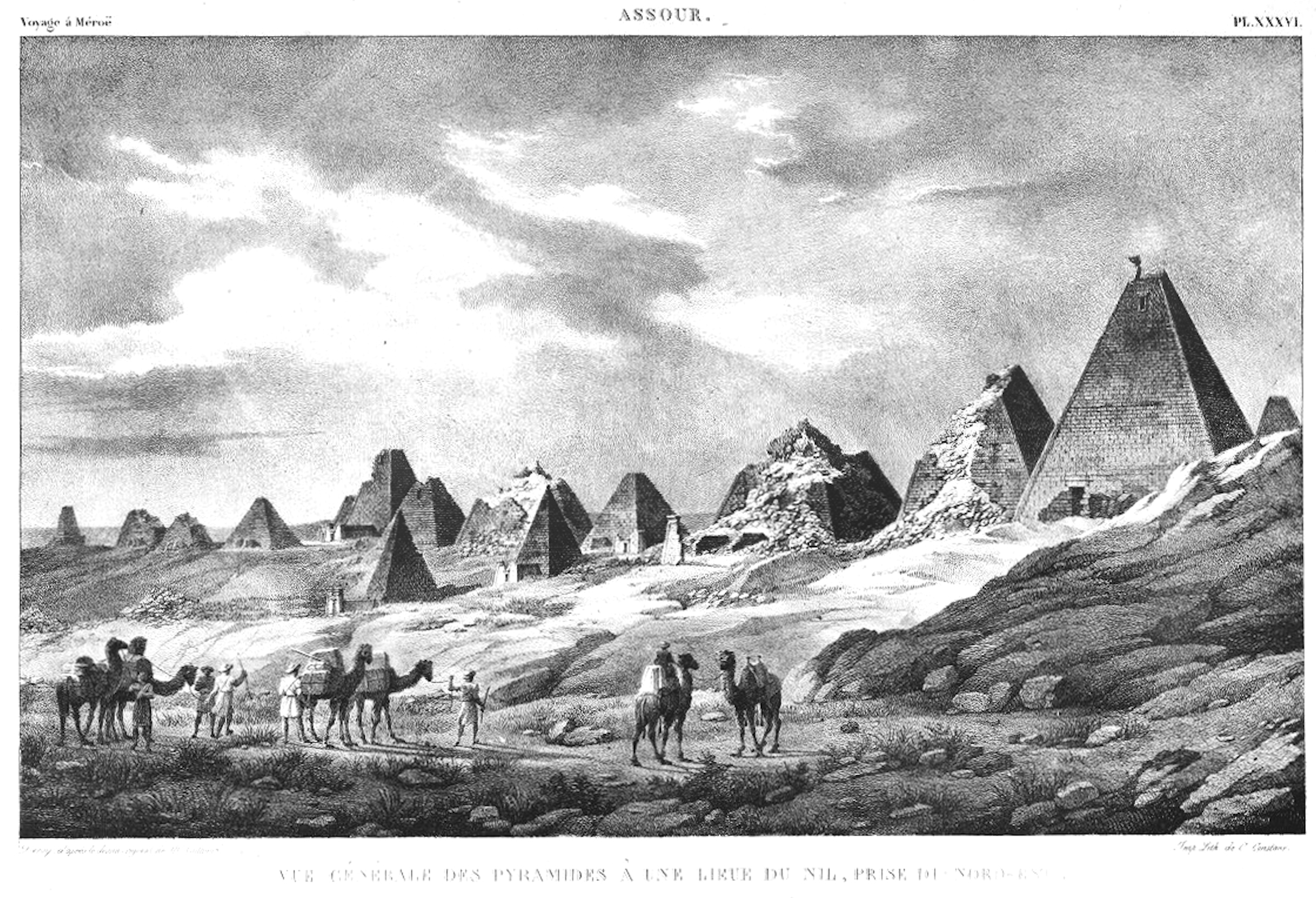
Pyramids of Meroe (Begarawiyah) in 1821

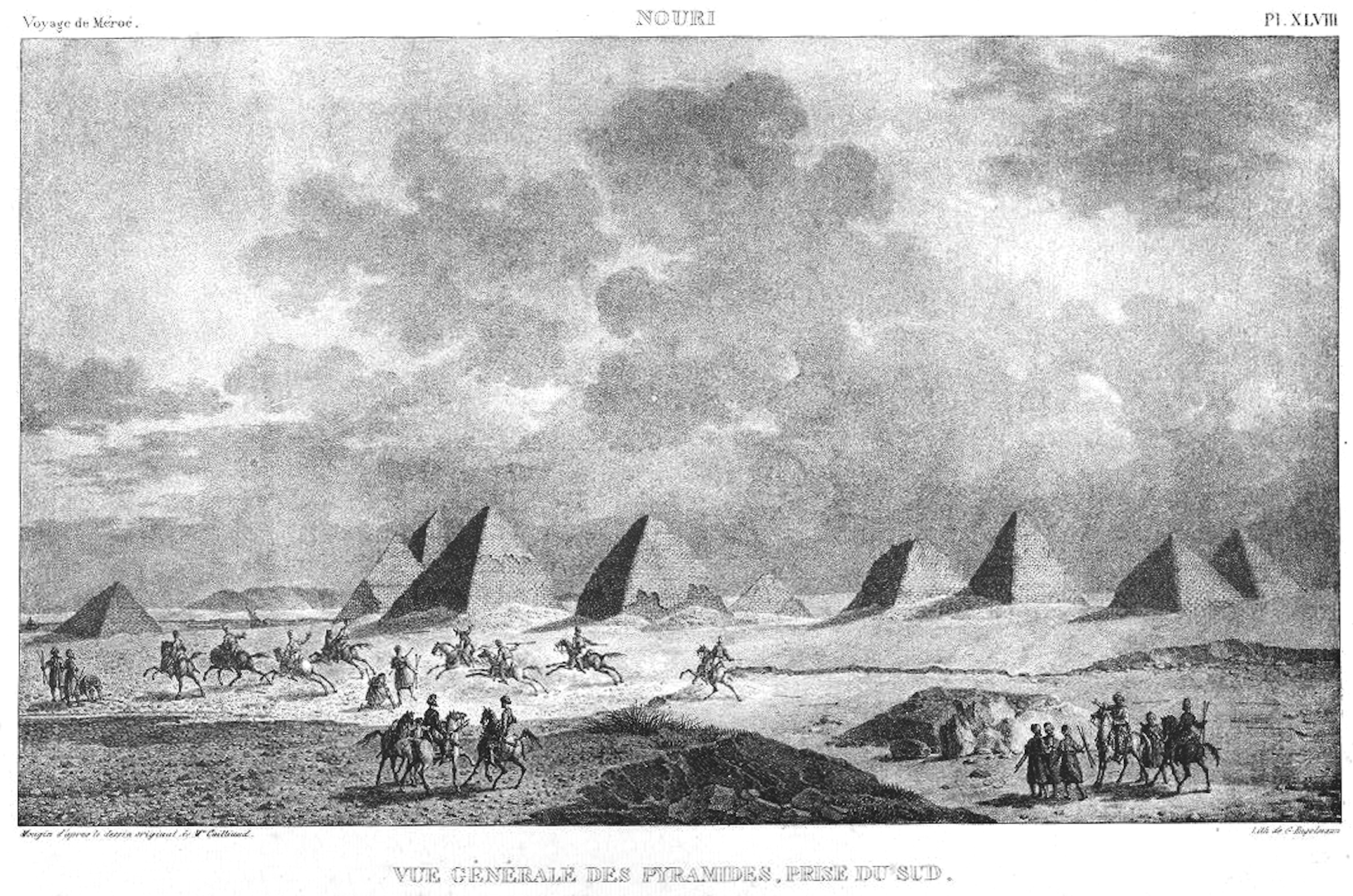
Pyramids of Nuri in 1821

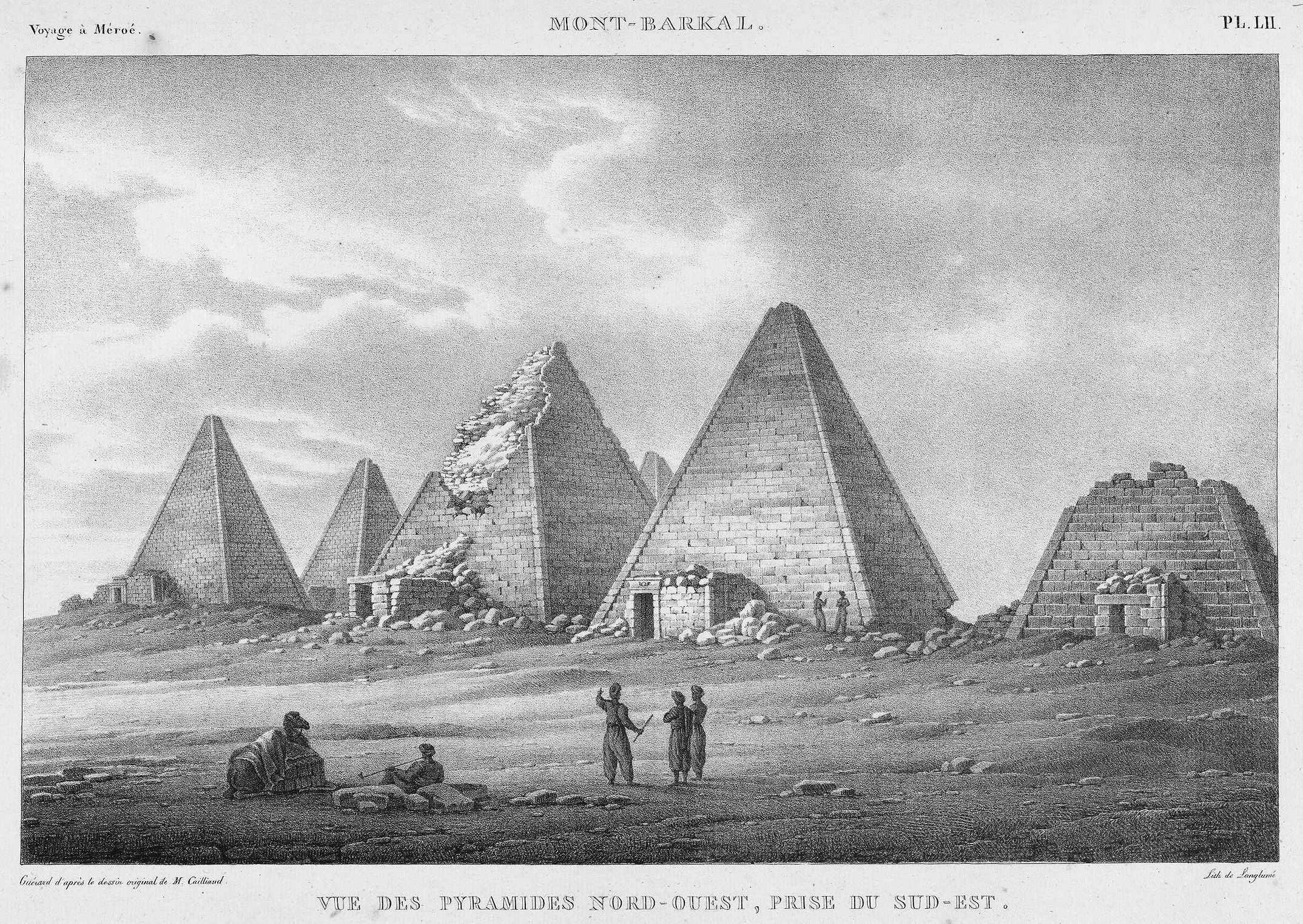
Pyramids at Jebel Barkal in 1821

== See also ==
- Ancient Egypt
- Candace of Meroë
- Egyptian pyramids
- Kingdom of Kush
- List of megalithic sites
- Meroë
- Nubia
- Nubian architecture
- Sedeinga pyramids
