= Public toilets in Sudan =

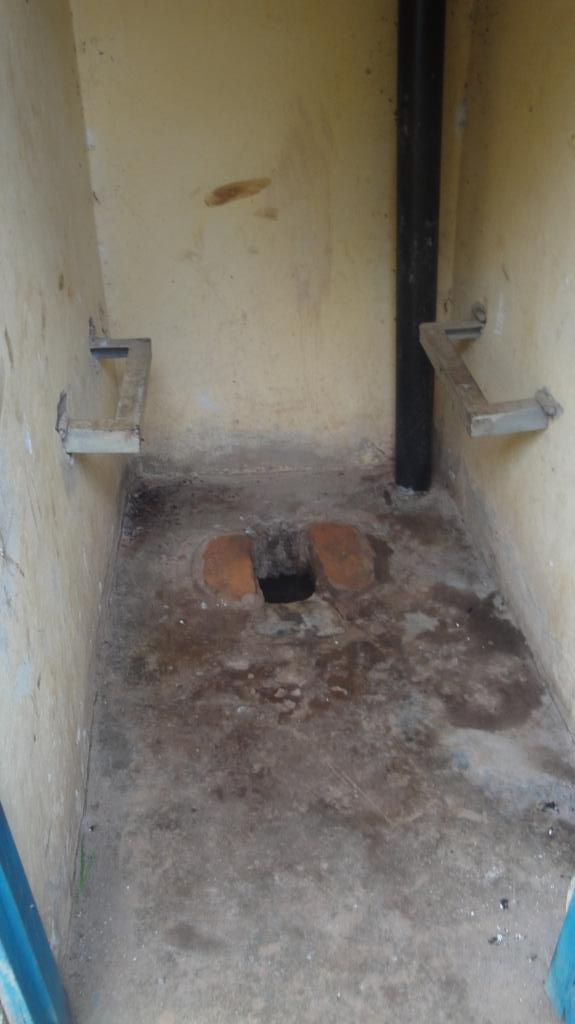
- A pit latrine toilet at a school

Language of toilets
- Native name: Arabic: حمام عام
- Men's toilets: Men
- Women's toilets: Women
- Local words: WC

Public toilet statistics

Public toilet use
- Type: squat toilet

Public toilets in Sudan are rare. In the Nubia era, there were large public toilet complexes. 10 million (around 20%) of Sudan’s population practices open defecation.

== Public toilets ==
There are few public toilets in Khartoum. Despite this, the city has a sewage and sanitation system, which many other African cities lack, that serves around 28% of the city's population.

== Ancient Nubia ==
In a Nubia era archaeological site about ten miles from the Nile River, a medieval monastery site revealed a row of fifteen toilets. It was the largest sanitary complex found in the Nubia region. The ancient public toilets had rectangular stalls and ceramic bowls. People used broken pottery to clean their anus area.

== Regional and global situation impacting public toilets in Sudan ==
Public toilet access around the world is most acute in the Global South, with around 3.6 billion people, 40% of the world's total population, lacking access to any toilet facilities. 2.3 billion people in the Global South do not have toilet facilities in their residence. Despite the fact that the United Nation made a declaration in 2010 that clean water and sanitation is a human right, little has been done in many places towards addressing this on a wider level. As a result, open defecation is often practiced, something which can have severe social consequences including loss of dignity and privacy. It also put women at risk of sexual violence.

Sit flush toilets are the most common type of toilet in North Africa. Flush toilets are often only found in affluent areas of developing countries. Islamic teachings suggest using water for cleaning after using the toilet. As a result, Arab travellers often take with them handheld portable bidet when they go on trips.
