= Shanakdakhete =

Queen of the Kingdom of Kush

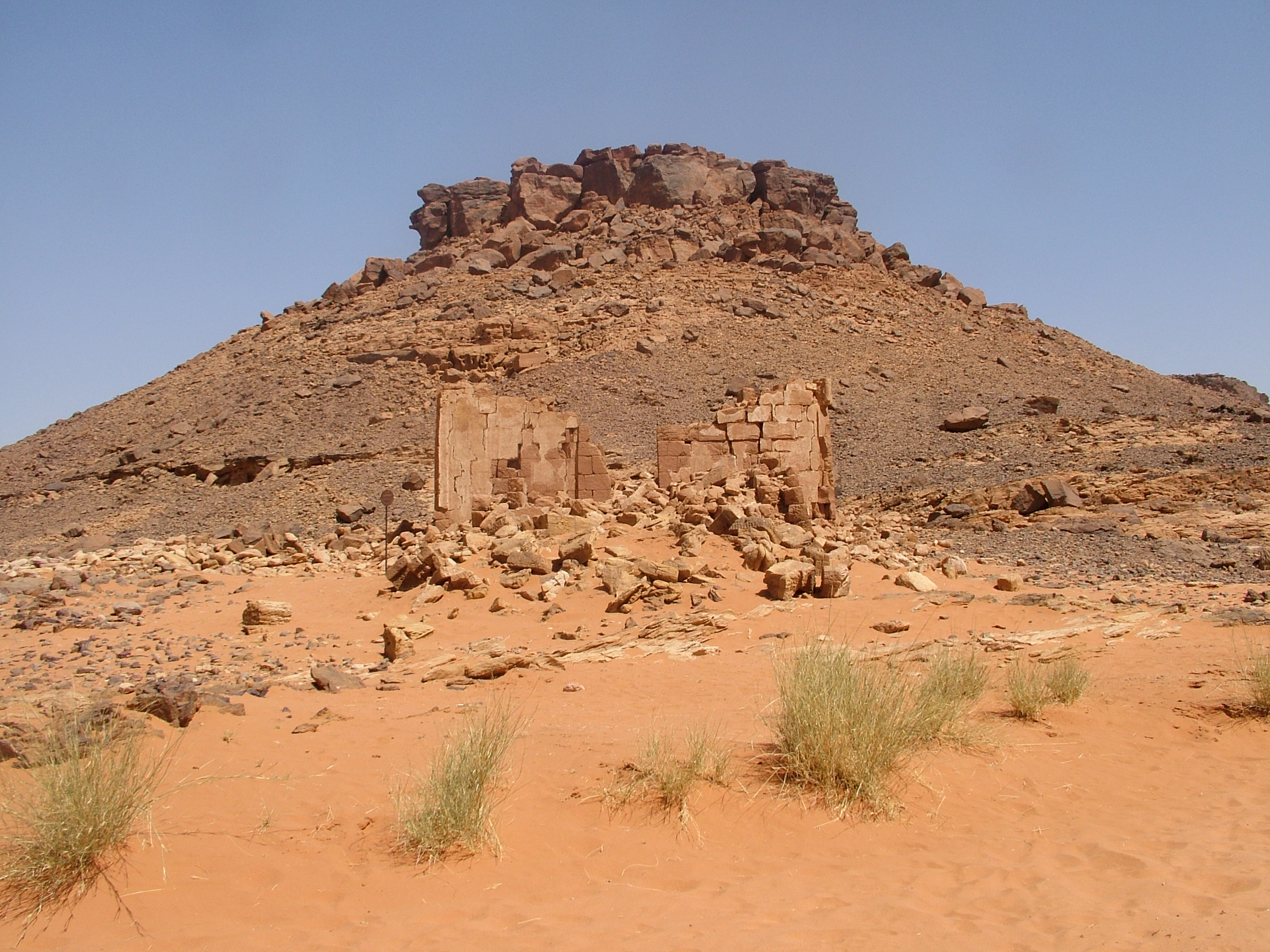
- Ruins of Temple F in Naqa, built under Shanakdakhete

Kushite Queen of Meroë
- Reign: First half of the 1st century AD
- Predecessor: Amanishakheto (?)
- Successor: Unknown king (Bar. 2) (?)
Royal titulary
- Burial: Meroë, pyramid Beg. N 21 (?)

Shanakdakhete, also spelled Shanakdakheto or Sanakadakhete, was a queen regnant of the Kingdom of Kush, ruling from Meroë in the early first century AD. Shanakdakhete is poorly attested, though is known to have constructed a temple in Naqa.

Shanakdakhete was previously believed to have been the first Kushite queen regnant due to an erroneous dating of her inscriptions. This role is now instead attributed to Nahirqo.

== Sources ==
Shanakdakhete is known only from hieroglyphic inscriptions at Temple F in Naqa. The inscriptions are accompanied by reliefs depicting the queen, though these are badly damaged. Shanakdakhete was responsible for building Temple F, replacing an earlier structure in the same place. Shanakdakhete is in the inscriptions titled as Son of Ra, Lord of the Two Lands, Shanakdakheto.

== Chronology ==
In older scholarship, Shanakdakhete's inscriptions were considered to be the earliest examples of the Meroitic script. She was based on this traditionally dated to the late second century BC. This interpretation made Shanakdakhete the earliest recorded Kushite queen regnant, which in turn led scholars to attribute the pyramid Beg. N 11 to her. This pyramid dates to the second century BC and does not preserve the name of the buried ruler, though depicts a queen regnant in its reliefs. A double statue depicting a female ruler together with a non-ruling prince was also attributed to Shanakdakhete.

Shanakdakhete's inscriptions were re-assessed by the Egyptologist Claude Rilly in 2004, who concluded that the text's paleography instead placed her much later, either around the turn of the century between the first century BC and the first century AD, or in the first half of the first century AD. Per Rilly (2004 & 2007) and Josefine Kuckertz (2021) both pyramid Beg. N 11 and the double statue previously associated with Shanakdakhete are "both now attributed with good reasons" to the queen regnant Nahirqo, dated to the second century BC. The re-attribution has been accepted by numerous other scholars, such as Janice Yellin (2020) and Francis Breyer (2022).

Similar spellings of hieroglyphic signs suggest that Shanakdakhete ruled close to the time of another queen regnant, Amanishakheto. Kuckertz (2021) placed Shanakdakhete as Amanishakheto's successor, ruling in the first half of the first century AD. Janice Yellin (2014) and Kuckertz also speculatively attributed the large pyramid Beg. N 21 to Shanakdakhete.

== See also ==
- Kandake
