= Claude Rilly =

French linguist and archaeologist

- Born: November 4, 1959 (age 66)
- Occupations: Linguist, Egyptologist, archaeologist

Academic work
- Institutions: French National Centre for Scientific Research
- Main interests: Meroitic and Nilo-Saharan languages
- Notable works: Le méroïtique et sa famille linguistique (2010)
- Notable ideas: Northern Eastern Sudanic languages

Claude Rilly (born November 4, 1959) is a French linguist, Egyptologist, and archaeologist at the French National Centre for Scientific Research who primarily specializes in Meroitic and Nilo-Saharan languages. He is professor at the École pratique des hautes études since 2019.

He is also the Director of the French Archaeological Mission in Sedeinga, Sudan.

In 2003, he received a PhD in Egyptology and Linguistics. His doctoral advisor was Pascal Vernus.

== Linguistics ==
Rilly proposed the Northern Eastern Sudanic languages in 2010.
