= Amanishakheto =

Kushite Kandake of Meroe

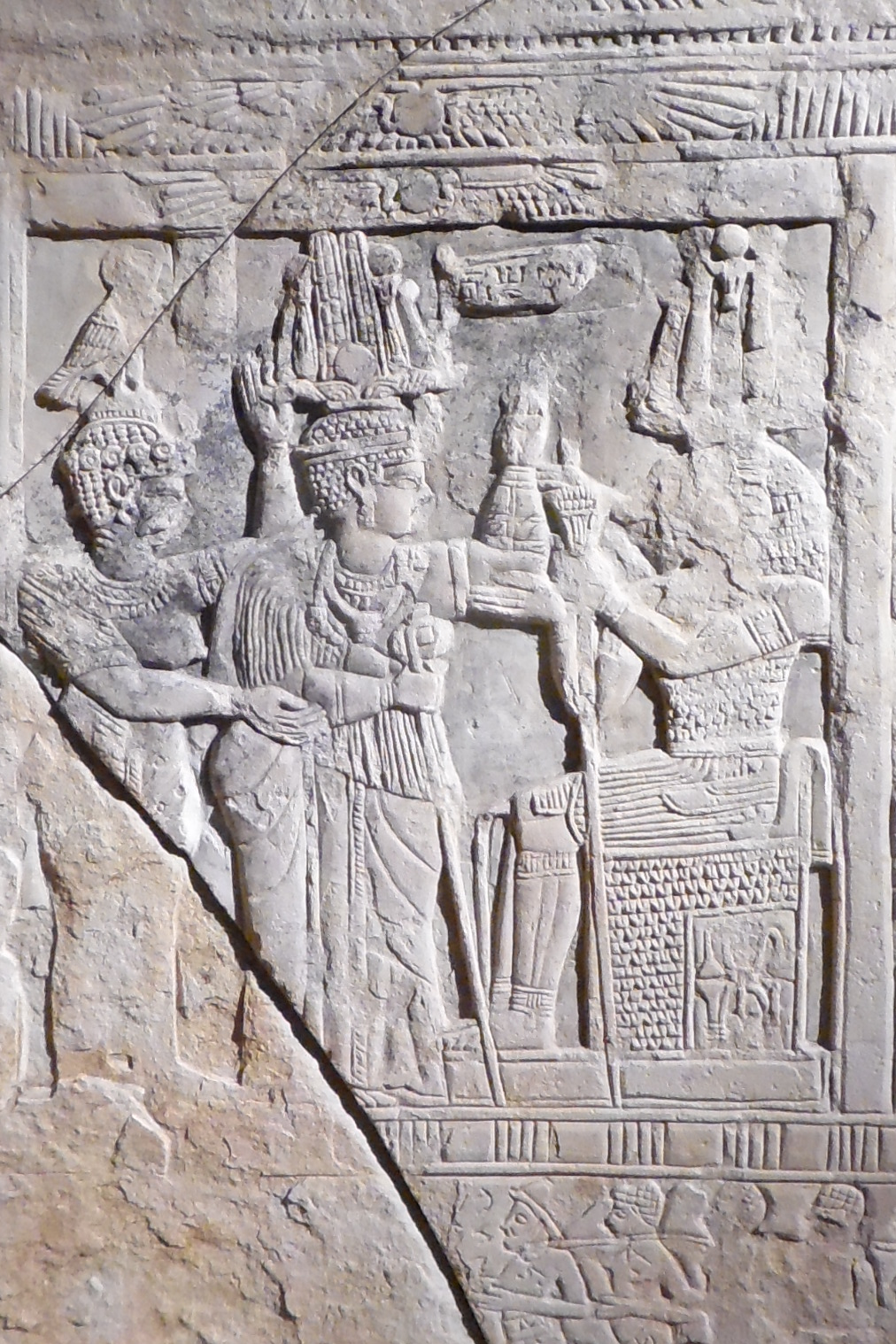
- Stele of Amanishakheto (center) from the temple of Amun in Naqa

Kushite Queen of Meroë
- Reign: Early 1st century AD
- Predecessor: Amanirenas
- Successor: Shanakdakhete
Royal titulary
Nomen
Amanischacheto

G39 N5	A1 A26 m n n M8 Sw ir stp F1 q
- Mother: Ar(...)tḫwit
- Burial: Meroë (Beg. N 6)

Amanishakheto was a queen regnant (kandake) of Kush who reigned in the early 1st century AD. In Meroitic hieroglyphs her name is written "Amanikasheto" (Mniskhte or (Am)niskhete). In Meroitic cursive she is referred to as Amaniskheto qor kd(ke) which means Amanishakheto, Qore and Kandake ("Ruler and Queen").

Amanishakheto is believed to have been the direct successor of the earlier queen regnant Amanirenas. Amanishakheto's mother is recorded to have been named Ar(...)tḫwit; the relation between Amanishakheto and Amanirenas is thus unknown. The chronologically next Kushite ruler, and thus Amanishakheto's possible successor, was another queen regnant, Shanakdakhete.

== Monuments ==
Amanishakheto is known from several monuments. She is mentioned in the Amun-temple of Kawa, on a stela from Meroe, and in inscriptions of a palace building found at Wad ban Naqa, from a stela found at Qasr Ibrim, another stela from Naqa and her pyramid at Meroe (Beg. no. N6).

Amanishakheto is best known for a collection of jewellery discovered in her pyramid in 1834 by Italian treasure hunter Giuseppe Ferlini, who destroyed the pyramid in search of its burial goods. It was a treasure that fulfilled all his expectations: it consisted of 10 bracelets, 9 shield rings, 67 signet rings, 2 collars or necklaces, and a large number of amulets, all created by the best craftsmen of the Kingdom of Meroë. These pieces are now in the Egyptian Museum of Berlin and in the Egyptian Museum of Munich.

=== Sandstone Relief ===
A sandstone relief depicting the queen, now at the Khartoum National Museum in Sudan, was found in the Temple of Amun in Naqa. The relief depicts Queen Amanishakheto next to two deities. In Egyptian art, people depicted seated are of highest importance, followed by whoever is facing towards the right. It is also important to note the hierarchy of scale. In this depiction, Amanishakheto is taller than the two figures however, the god that is seated would be taller than the two women. The deities have been identified as Amesemi and Apedemak, the warrior god and goddess. Amanishakheto is also seen wearing the royal costume that is associated with the Nubian warrior and hunting gods which further highlights her importance as a protector of her kingdom. The depiction of the queen with the two gods further emphasizes her power and status.

=== Stele of Queen Amanishakheto and the goddess Amesemi ===
The stele on the left is another representation of Amanishakheto accompanied by the warrior goddess, Amesemi. This stele is made from sandstone and was found in the Temple of Amun in Naqa. The two women are depicted wearing similar garments: fitted clothing, a scarf with a tassel, a collar, and rounded wigs. Their bodies are represented in different ways however, the goddess has a slimmer figure with a dress that features more elaborate details. Amanishakheto is depicted in a more curvaceous way. The interaction between the two seems to be intimate, which also speaks to the power Queen Amanishakheto had. The hieroglyphs in the back of the stele identify both women. This stele was placed in the Temple of Amun in Naqa, which was built after the death of Queen Amanishakheto.

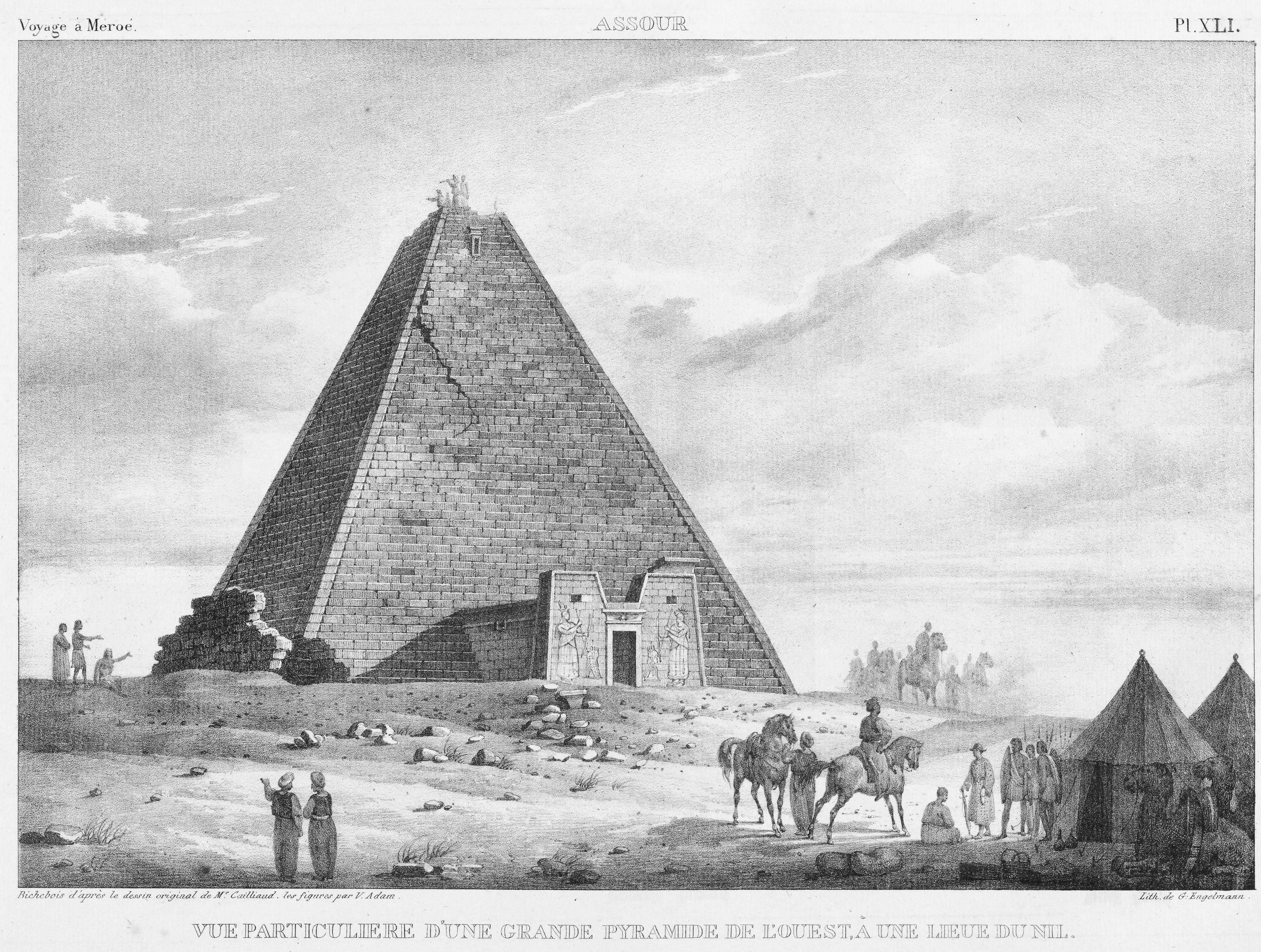
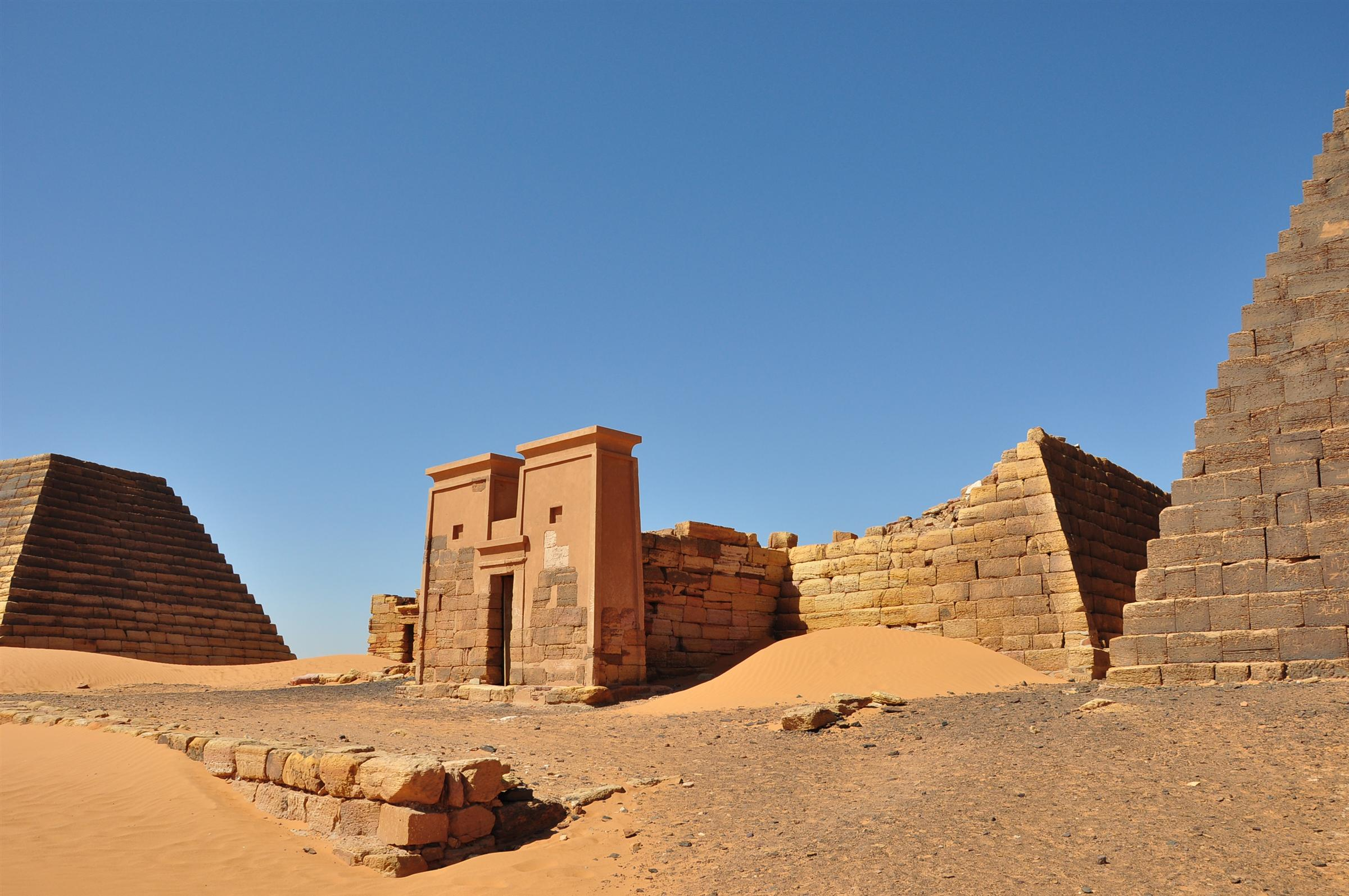
Great pyramid N6 of the Pyramids of Meroë, belonging to Queen Amanishakheto, before and after its destruction by the treasure-hunter Giuseppe Ferlini in the 1830s

== Gallery ==
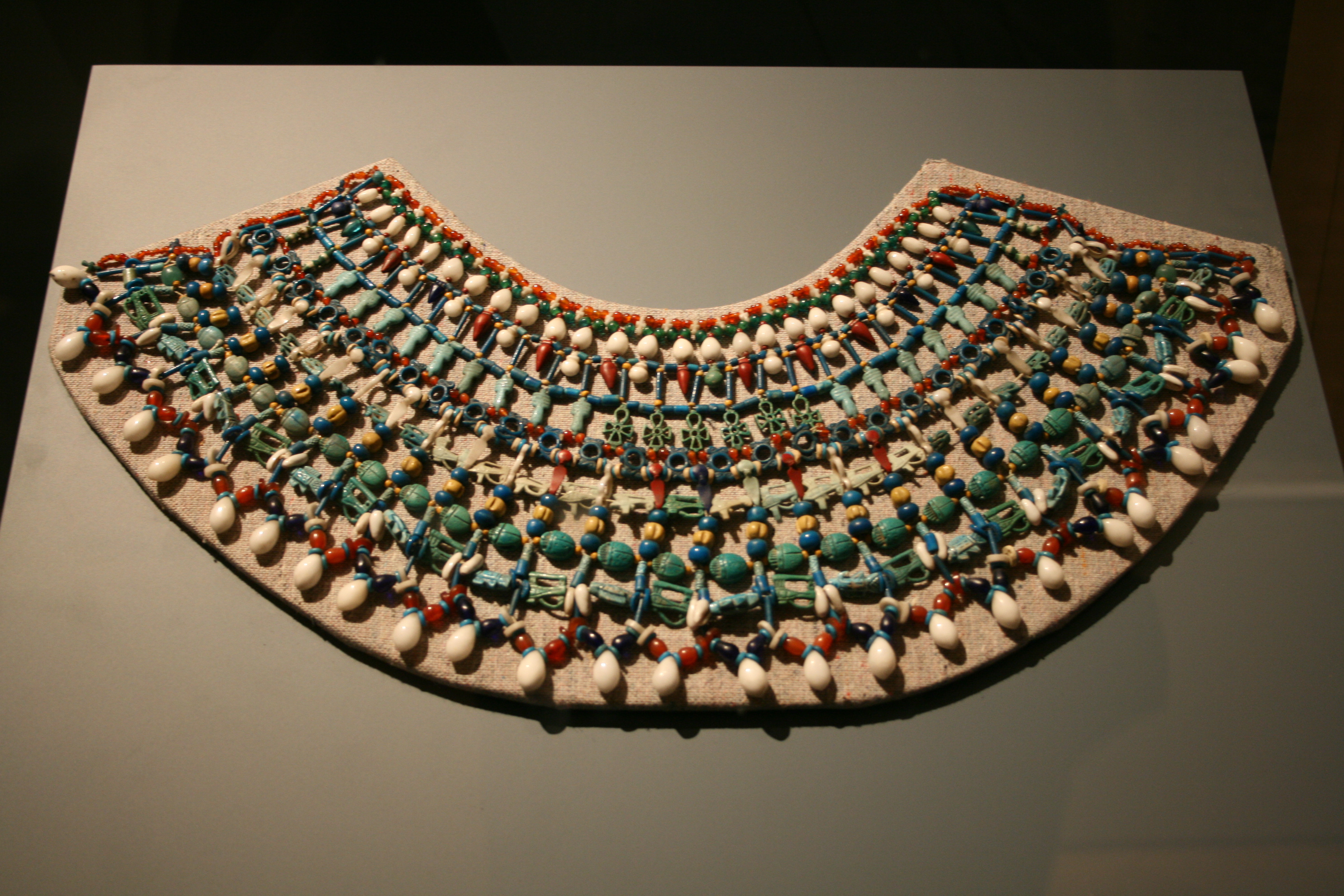
Usekh collar of the queen

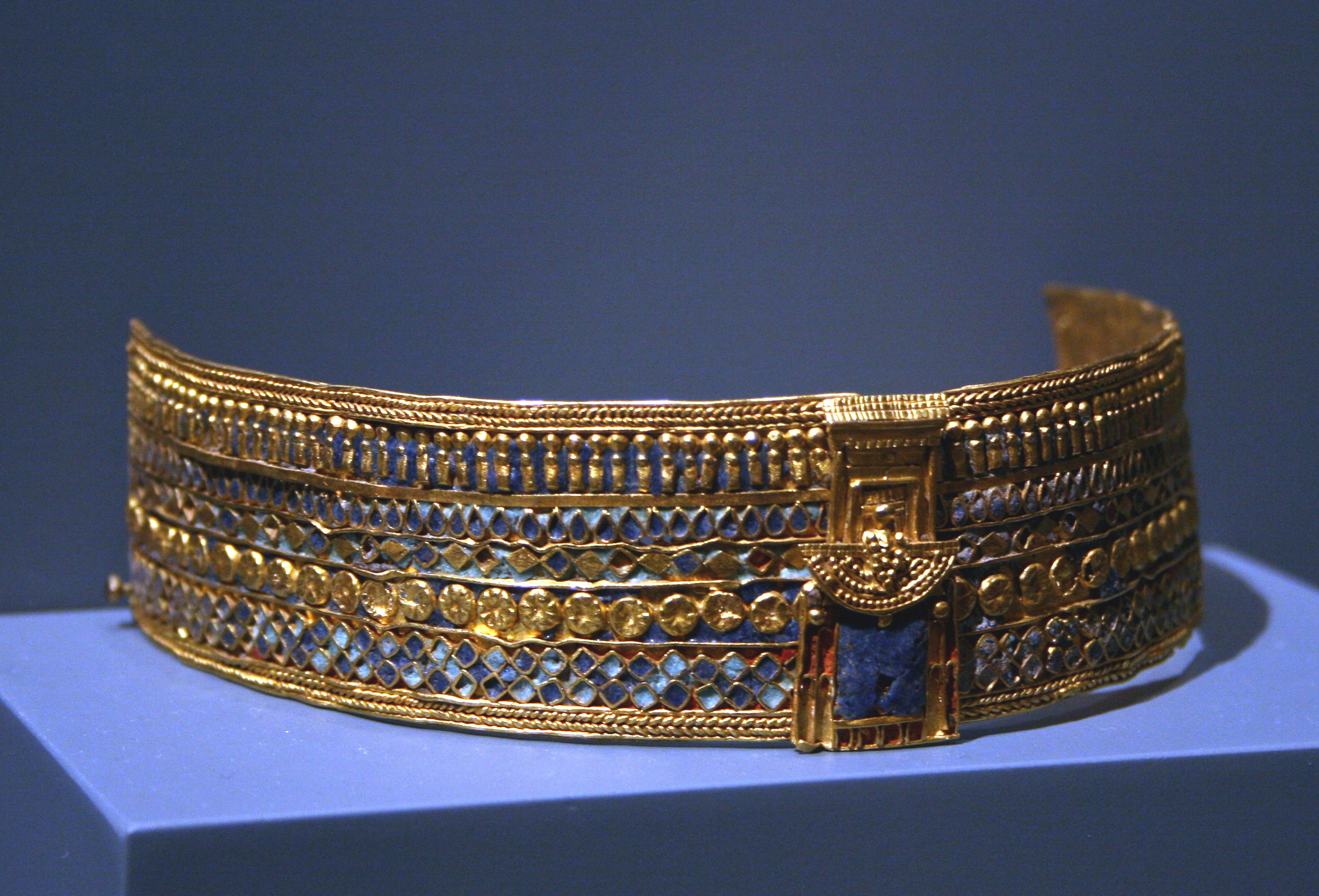
Bracelet from the tomb of Amanishakheto in Nubia

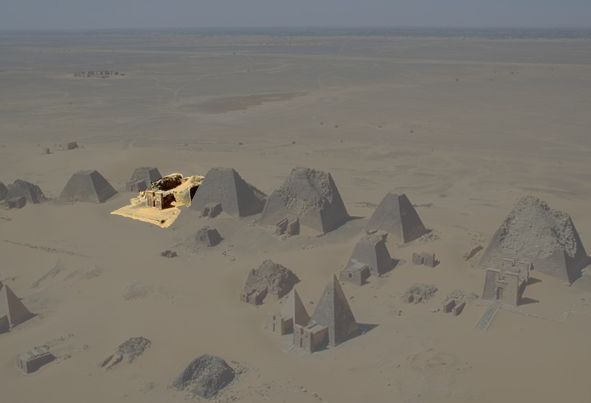
The Meroe pyramids. N6, the tomb of Amanishakheto, is highlighted

The Necklace of Queen Amanishakheto

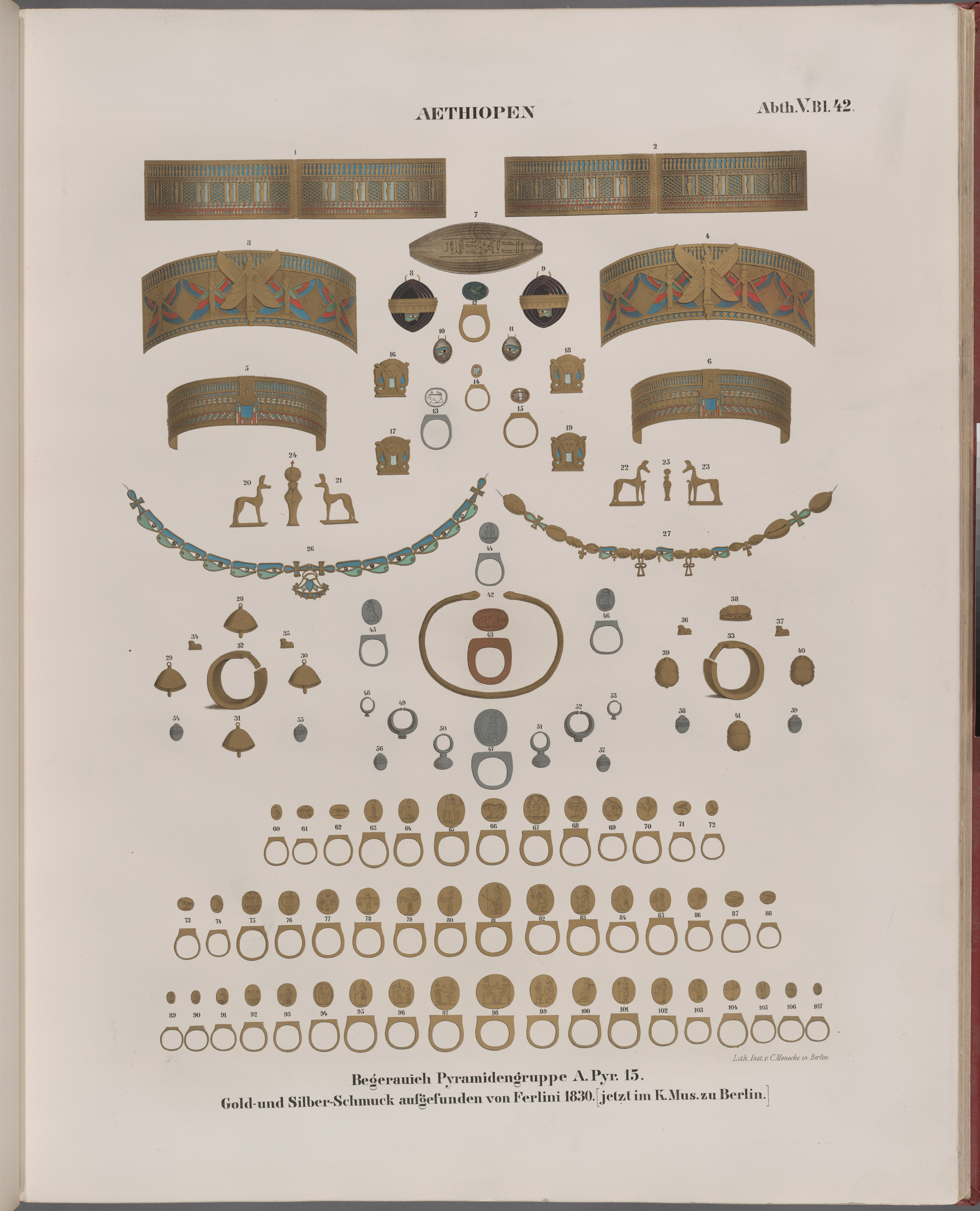
Some of the treasures discovered by Ferlini

== See also ==
- Kandake
