= Wad ban Naqa =

Ancient town of Kush

Coordinates: 16°30′40″N 33°06′44″E

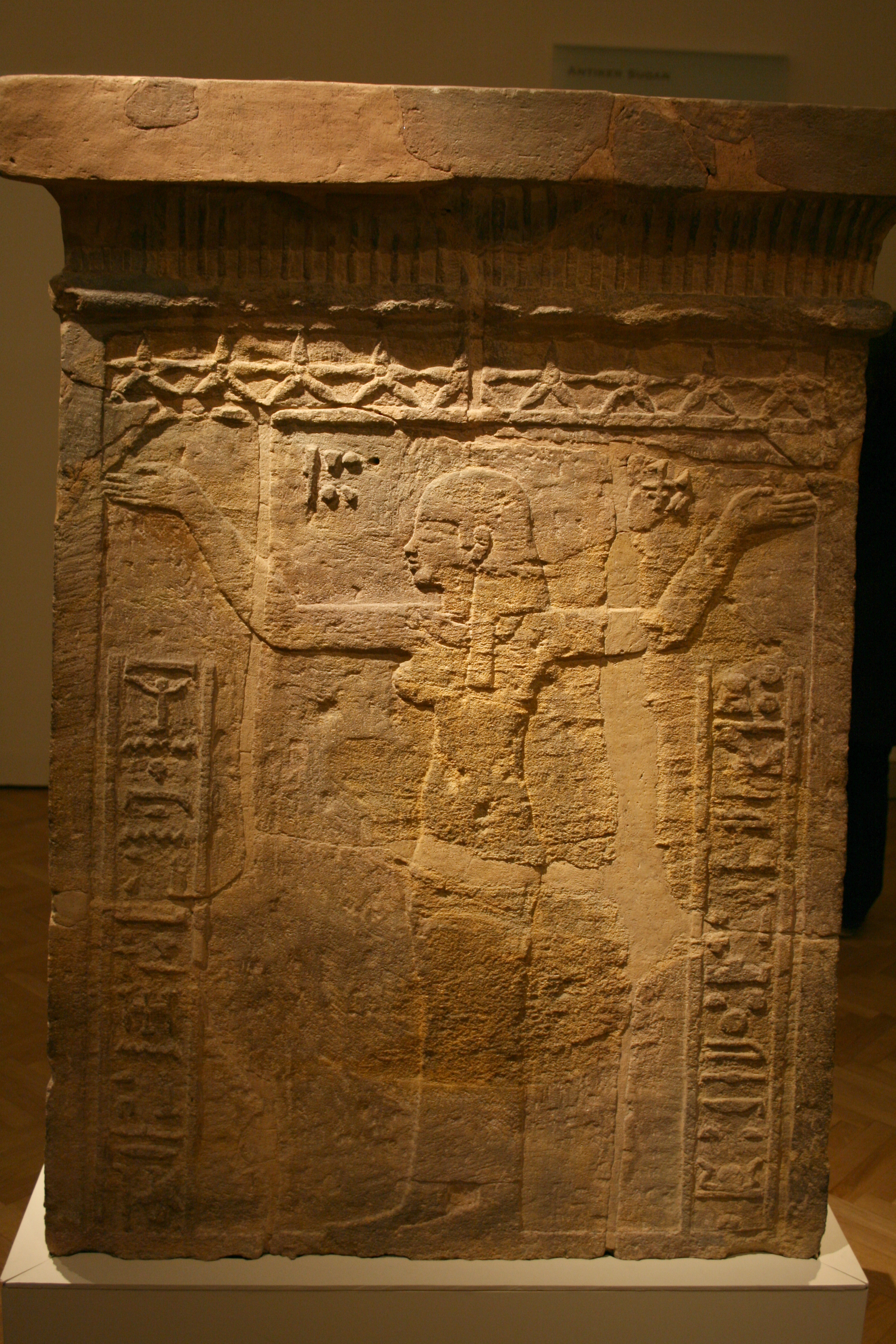
Barge pedestal on display in the Egyptian Museum of Berlin found in Wad ben Naga

Wad ben Naga (also Wad Ban Naqa or Wad Naga) is the name of an ancient town in the Kushitic Kingdom in present-day Sudan. The village lies on the eastern bank of the Nile, about 80 kilometers upstream of Meroë and about 40 km southwest of Shendi.

== History ==
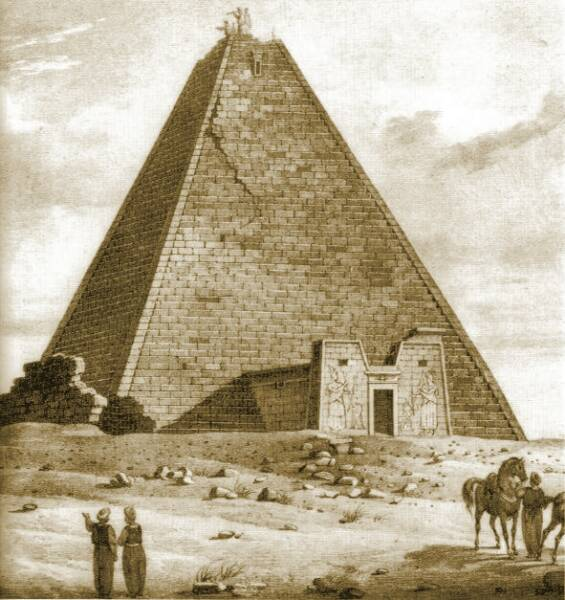
The pyramid

The place is so far little explored. The earliest known building on the site is a very large, two-story brick palace built by Queen Amanishakheto (first century AD) whose large pyramid in the royal cemetery at Meroe (BEG N 6) contained a hoard of gold jewellery found in the early 19th century by the Italian treasure hunter, Giuseppe Ferlini (NB: several references to this site erroneously identify the pyramid as having been built at Wad ben Naga).

South of the palace is a circular building of unknown function, whose walls are still up to 5 m high. There was a temple of Isis that has now been destroyed. Nearby was small temple with columns with the god Bes carved on them that might have functioned as a divine birth house (mammisi). It was probably built by Natakamani and Amanitore (first century AD). There are the remains of several other unexplored temples at the site in addition to the one dedicated to Isis. New excavations at the site began in 2009 under the direction of the National Museum of the Czech Republic.

== Bibliography ==
- Wildung, Dietrich (1997), Sudan: Ancient Kingdoms of the Nile
- Wenig, Steffen : Die meroitische Königin Amanitore. Barkenuntersatz aus Wad Ban Naqa (Sudan), um 20 u.Z., Nr. 7261. Neue Museumskunde 20 (2) (1977), S. 82
- The temple of Apedemak in Naqua. In László Török (2002). The image of the ordered world in ancient Nubian art: the construction of the Kushite mind, 800 BC-300 AD. BRILL. ISBN 978-90-04-12306-9. S. 226f.
