= Sedeinga pyramids =

Group of 35 small pyramids near Sedeinga, Sudan

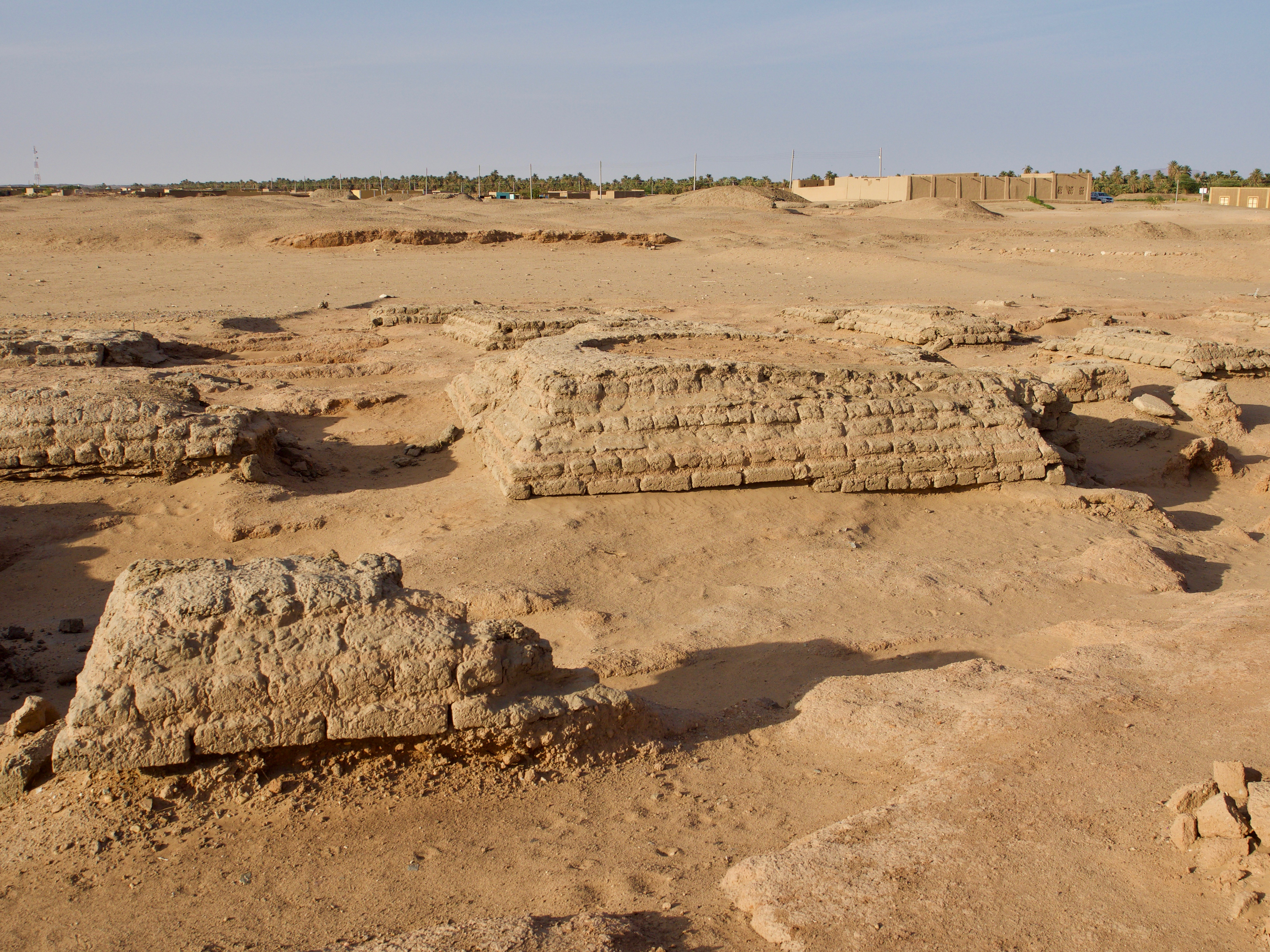
- Napatan-Meroic Necropolis of Sedeinga

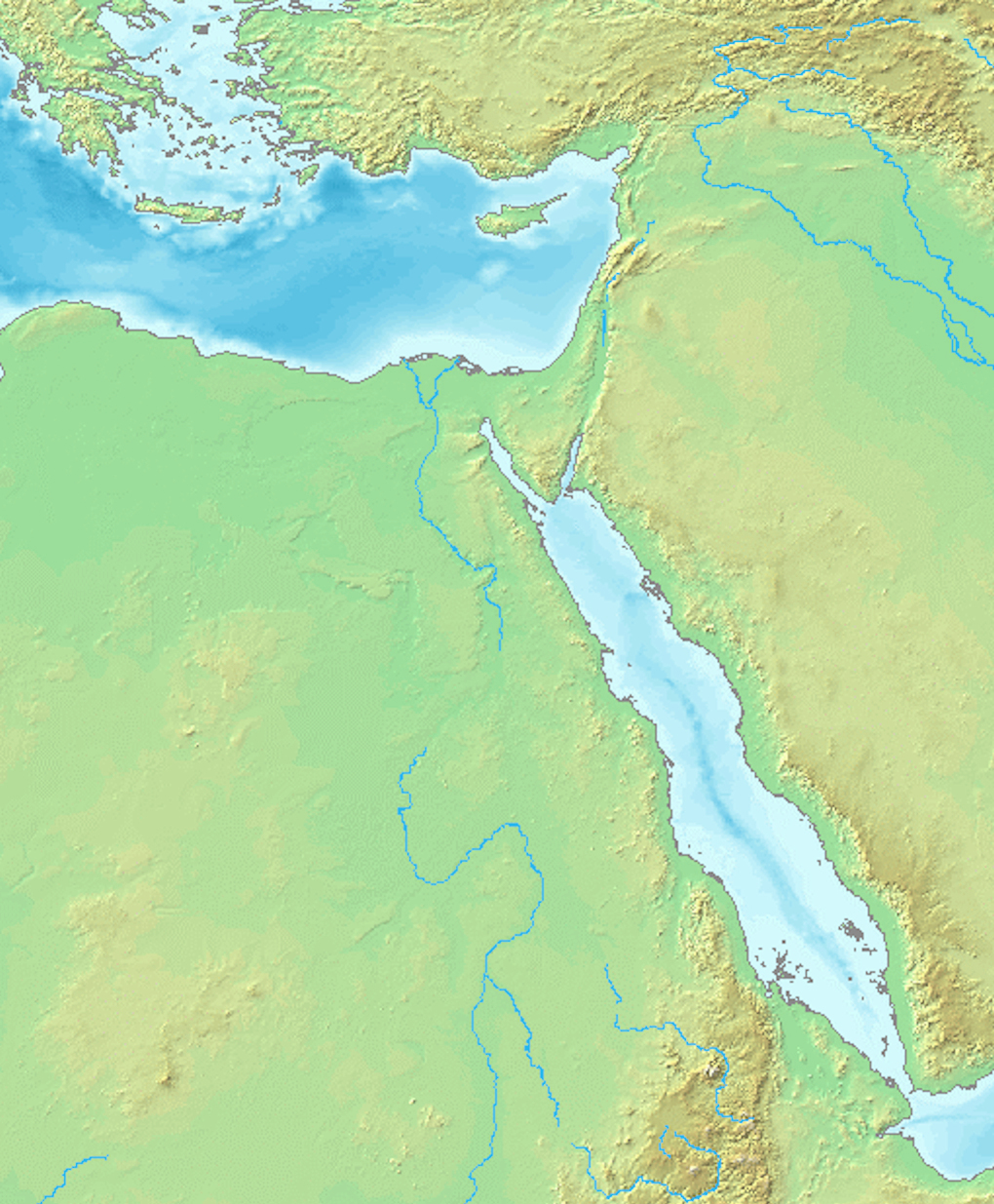
- Location within Northeast Africa Location within Sudan
- 20°33′11.92″N 30°17′27.48″E
- Type: Settlement
- Location: Northern State, Sudan
- Region: Nubia

Site notes
- Condition: restored

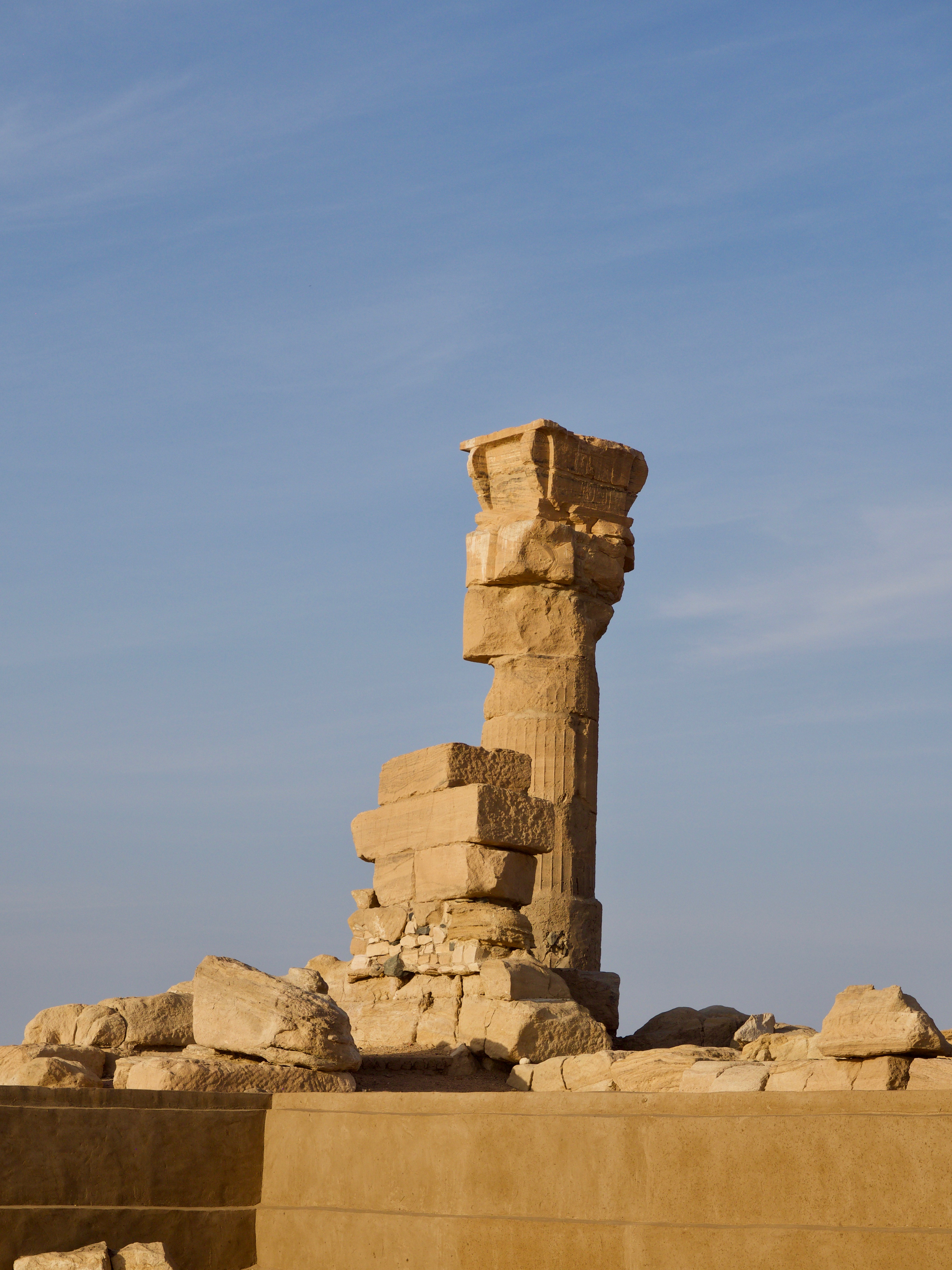
Temple of Queen Tiyi at Sedeinga

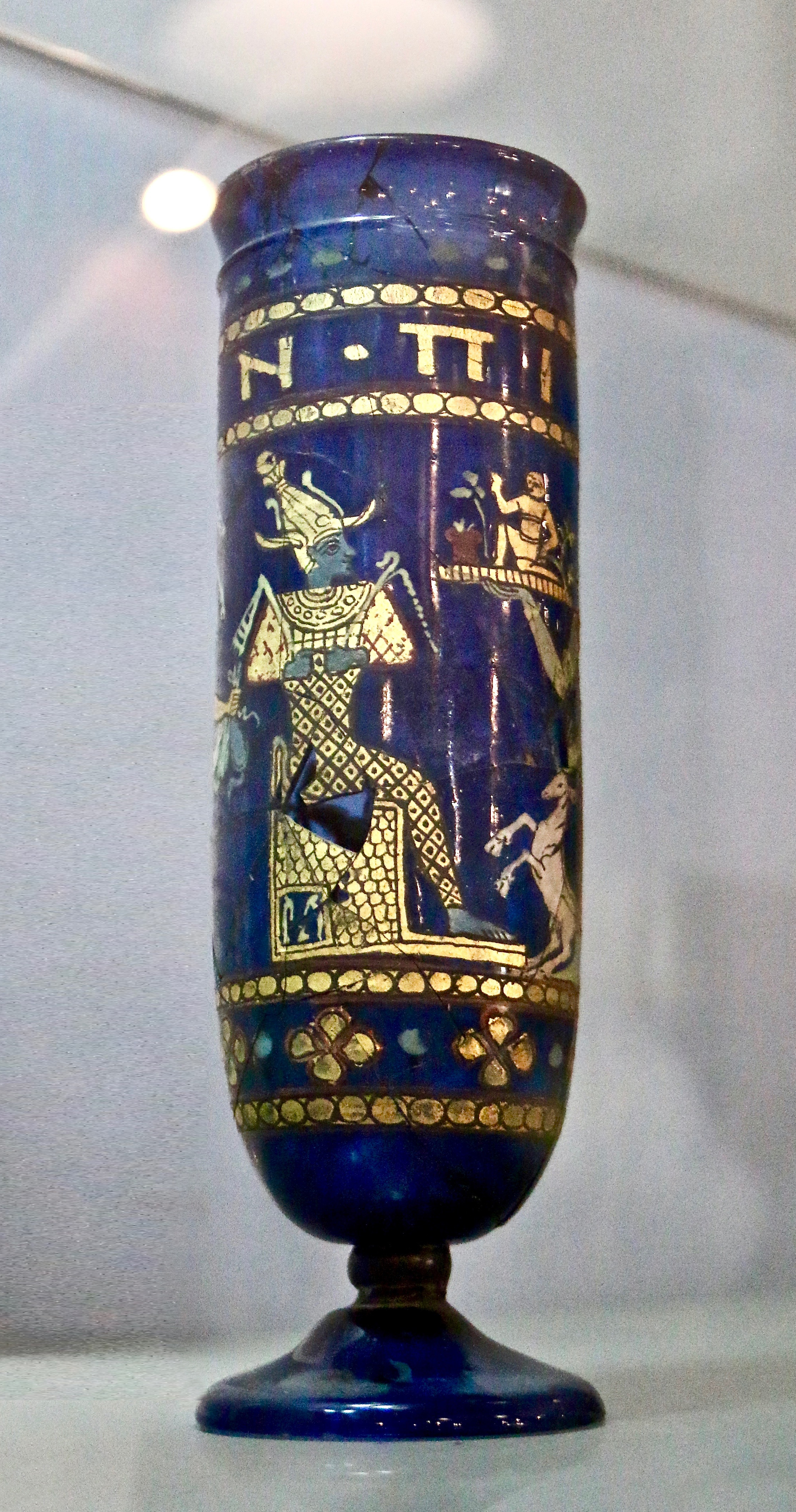
Chalice from Sedeinga, National Museum of Sudan, Khartoum, Sudan

The Sedeinga pyramids are a group of at least 80 small pyramids near Sedeinga, Sudan, built ca. 1 BCE. They were discovered between 2009 and 2012 and date to the time of the Kingdom of Kush, an ancient kingdom in Nubia. They range in size from about 6.7 metres (22 ft) to 75 centimetres (30 in) wide.

== Location ==
The Sedeinga pyramid site is located in northern Sudan on the west bank of the Nile River. It lies roughly 60 miles (100 km) north of the Nile's third cataract, and 450 miles (720 km) northwest of Meroë, the Meroitic period capital of the Kingdom of Kush, where similar pyramids have been found. Isolated from the greater part of Kush, Sedeinga is found alone in the desert along an ancient trade route. This route connected the Kingdom of Kush directly with Middle Egypt, suggesting that Sedeinga may have been a trade settlement. Located not far from the Egyptian border, Sedeinga would have had first access to the goods brought by Egyptian traders, which might explain the origin of the wealth demonstrated in the burial pyramids.

== Pyramids ==
The pyramid site consists of thousands of burial chambers including the bases of at least 80 small pyramids dating to late Meroitic period of the Kingdom of Kush. The pyramids were constructed of stone block over a round masonry chamber symbolic of the older Kush tradition of earthen burial mounds. Unlike the pyramids found in the Kush capital of Meroë, which were reserved for royalty, the Sedeinga Pyramids were constructed mainly for wealthy citizens. While it was considered sacrilegious for anyone but royalty to be buried in this manner during the early Meroitic period, with the passing of time and the isolation of Sedeinga from Meroë, the tradition extended to the wealthy. The Sedeinga pyramids also exhibited a greater Egyptian influence than their counterparts in Meroë, typified by capstones depicting birds or lotuses emerging from solar discs. While excavation of the Sedeinga pyramid site is not complete, there are indications that it may contain more Kush pyramids than any site discovered as of yet.

== Artifacts ==
In April 2018, archeologists announced the discovery of a large number of stone funerary inscriptions in the Sedeinga necropolis. The stone inscriptions constitute the largest collection of texts ever discovered written in Meroitic, which one of the oldest known writing systems of Africa.

Many of the artifacts unearthed at the Sedeinga site are in remarkably good condition, with some steles conserving their blue pigment.

One particularly notable find was a chapel lintel with a representation of the Egyptian goddess Maat. The lintel was noteworthy for being the first known representation of Maat with distinctive features from traditional Egyptian types.

Numerous Sedeinga artifacts were dedicated to high-ranking women, emphasizing the fact that Nubia was a matrilineal society.

== See also ==
- Nubian pyramids
- Pyramids at El-Kurru
- Pyramids of Jebel Barkal
- Pyramids of Meroë
- Pyramids of Nuri
