= Giuseppe Ferlini =

Italian physician and treasure hunter (1797–1870)

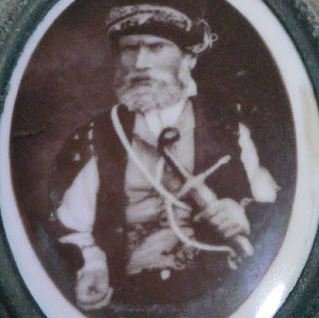
- Photograph of Giuseppe Ferlini
- Born: 23 April 1797; Bologna, Cispadane Republic
- Died: 30 December 1870 (aged 73); Bologna, Kingdom of Italy
- Resting place: Certosa di Bologna
- Known for: Destruction of pyramids at Meroë

Giuseppe Ferlini (Italian: [dʒuˈzɛppe ferˈliːni]; 23 April 1797 – 30 December 1870) was an Italian medical doctor, soldier and treasure hunter. A pioneer in the sale of Kushite antiquities, he is best known for his destruction and dismantling of various Nubian pyramids in the ancient city of Meroë, including that belonging to Kandake Amanishakheto in 1834. Ferlini's archaeological methods have been criticized for focusing on treasure retrieval over scientific and contextual documentation as well as badly damaging the pyramids of Meroë.

== Biography ==
=== Early life ===
Born in Bologna, in 1815 he travelled to Greece, where he practised as a physician and surgeon. In Greece he began to take an interest in archaeology and to conduct excavations. In 1826, he published a short scientific monograph describing a cave on Mount Parnassus. In 1829 he moved to Egypt where he joined the Egyptian Army during the conquest of Sudan. In 1830 he became a surgeon major. Under the army, he stayed in Sennar and then in Khartoum where he met the Albanian merchant Antonio Stefani. Spurred by legends from local workers who talked about 40 ardeb of gold hidden in the ancient Nubian ruins, he decided to desert, determined to either "return home penniless, or carrying unprecedented treasures". In 1833 he asked for and obtained from the Governor-General of the Sudan, Ali Kurshid Pasha, the permission to perform excavations in the area around the Kushite city of Meroë, discovered by the French scholar Frédéric Cailliaud a few years earlier. Along with Stefani, Ferlini organized an expedition that left for Meroë on 10 August 1834.

=== Excavations and criticisms ===
Upon arriving in Meroë, Ferlini undertook the exploration of the area surrounding the ancient capital. A temple near Berber, richly decorated and inscribed with hieroglyphics, captured his attention. He proceeded to clear the sand, locate the entrance, and meticulously examine it from all angles for an extended period but was unable to enter it. After twenty days of unfruitful research, the expedition moved to Wad ban Naqa, a small village on the banks of the River Nile. The discovery of remnants of ancient columns in the vicinity of the village prompted a second attempt, which resulted in the finding of a modest burial ground, several terracotta vases and an impressive granite pillar adorned with figures and hieroglyphs.

Eventually, Ferlini turned to the pyramids of Meroë, scattered on the hills around the village of Es-Sour. He started to raid and demolish – even using explosives – several pyramids, which were found "in good conditions" by Cailliaud just a few years earlier. As his initial excavations in smaller pyramids produced no results, he decided to work on the great pyramid N6, the tomb of the kandake Amanishakheto which till those days still stood at a height of 28m. He levelled the pyramid, starting from the top, and found a treasure composed of dozens of pieces of gold and silver jewellery located in a chamber a little below the apex. Ferlini's discovery was exceptional, as the treasure had remained undisturbed since the Queen's burial, despite most of the tombs being looted in ancient times.

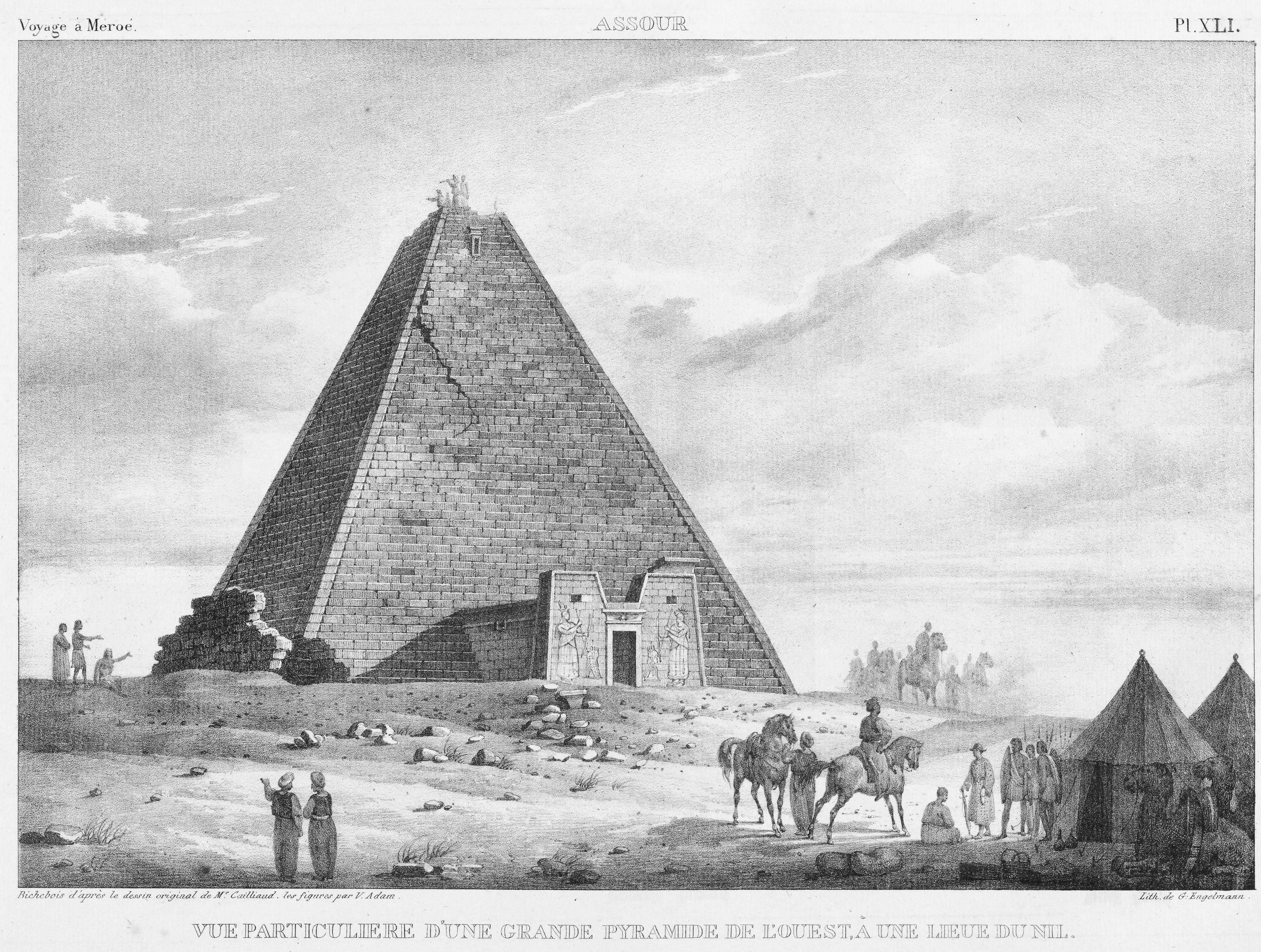
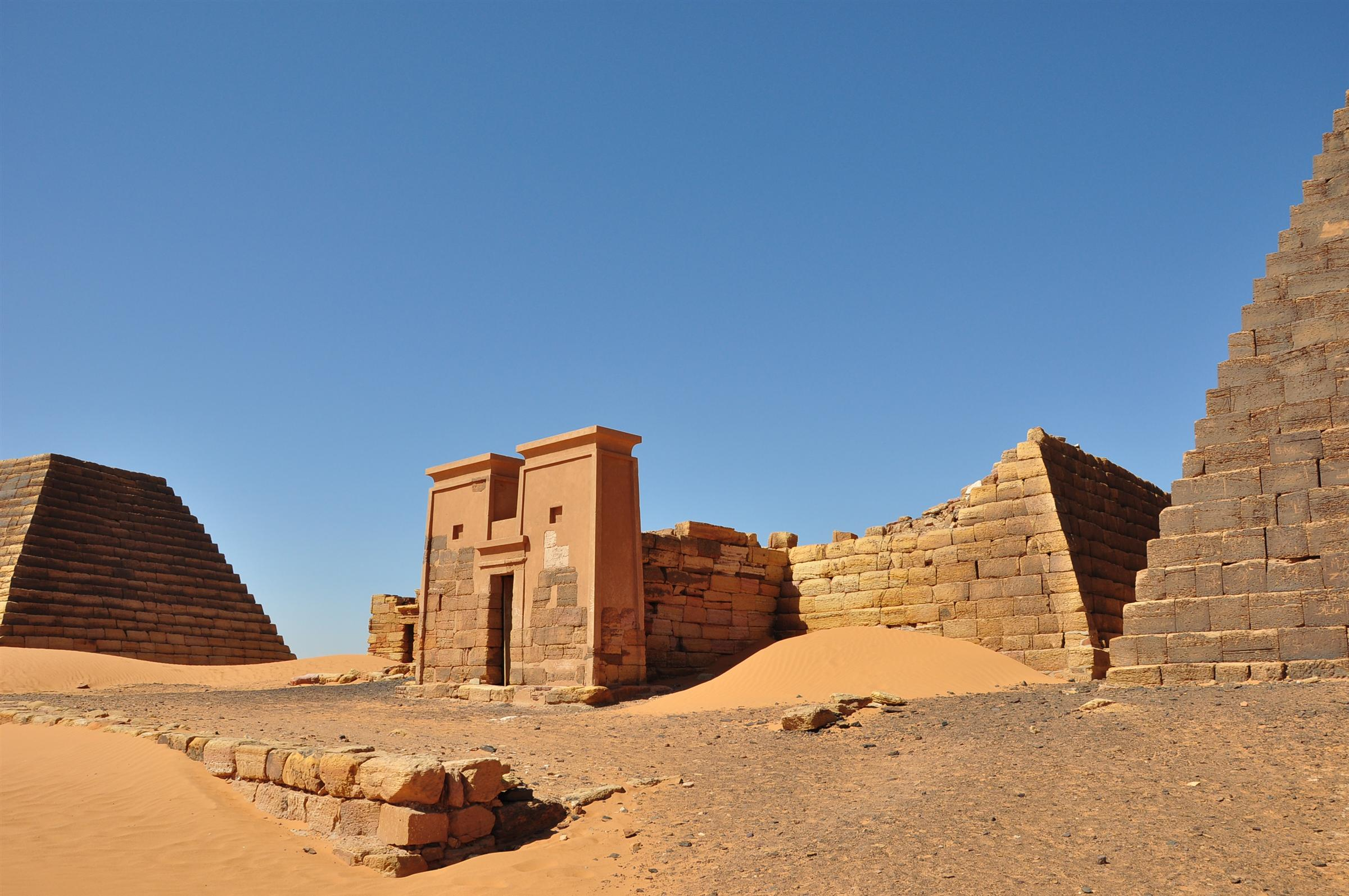
Great pyramid N6 of the Pyramids of Meroë, belonging to Queen Amanishakheto, before and after its destruction by Giuseppe Ferlini in the 1830s

Ferlini recounts dismantling five, possibly six, pyramids stone by stone: first four smaller ones, then the tallest in the necropolis, that of Queen Amanishakheto. While work was being carried out on the latter pyramid, Ferlini started working on another small pyramid. However, while Ferlini does not appear to have personally destroyed many of these monuments, his actions, especially the discovery of the treasure in Amanishakheto's Pyramid, may have inspired imitators. In his report on his travels in the Meroë region (April 1844), the Prussian archaeologist Karl Richard Lepsius noted that 'the discovery of Ferlini is in everybody's head still, and has brought many a pyramid to ruin.' Lepsius himself had to contend with Osman Bey, an Egyptian military commander who had arrived in Meroë with an army of 5,000 men with the intention of destroying the pyramids in search of treasure.

=== Return to Italy ===
When Amanishakheto's pyramid had been dismantled, Ferlini began digging a tunnel at its base. He discovered a masonry wall which he believed was part of an even more opulent tomb. Eager to keep his find a secret, he dismissed all the workers he had hired for the excavations and continued on alone. Sensing that an important discovery had been made, the workers rebelled, forcing Ferlini and Stefani to flee the area. The two men slipped away in the middle of the night and travelled upstream on the Nile. Once in Cairo, they set sail for Italy with the treasure.

In 1836, the Bolognese scholar Carlo Pancaldi published a report on Ferlini's discoveries. Encouraged by the positive reception of Pancaldi's work in scholarly circles, Ferlini wrote a report of the expedition containing a catalog of his findings, which was translated to French and republished in 1838. (Note: Giuseppe Ferlini, Relation Historique des Fouilles Operées dans la Nubia par le docteur Joseph Ferlini de Bologna, suivie d'un catalogue des objets qu'il a trouvés dans l'une des quarante-sept pyramides aux environs de l'ancienne ville de Meroe, et d'une description des grands déserts de Coruscah et de Sinnaar. Rome, 1838.) Ferlini and Stefani tried to sell the treasure, but at this time nobody believed that such high quality jewellery could be made in Sub-Saharan Africa. At first they travelled to Paris to present their discoveries to Jacques-Joseph Champollion (also known as Champollion-Figeac), the brother of Jean-François Champollion who passed away in 1832. He introduced them to the director of the Cabinet des Médailles (now BnF Museum). However, the deal was not concluded, and this was the first in a series of failures and disappointments.

Several experts examined the objects, including Luigi Ungarelli, Ippolito Rosellini and Arcangelo Michele Migliarini. Sales negotiations were also held with both the Holy See and the Tuscan government. Part of the treasure was sent to London, where it aroused the interest of the British Museum. However, the museum eventually declined to purchase it after some of its experts concluded that it was fake. The treasures were eventually sold in Germany: a part was purchased by king Ludwig I of Bavaria and it's now in the State Museum of Egyptian Art of Munich, while the remaining – under suggestions of Lepsius and of Christian Charles Josias von Bunsen – was bought by the Egyptian Museum of Berlin where it still located.

Items retrieved by Ferlini from Amanishakheto's tomb

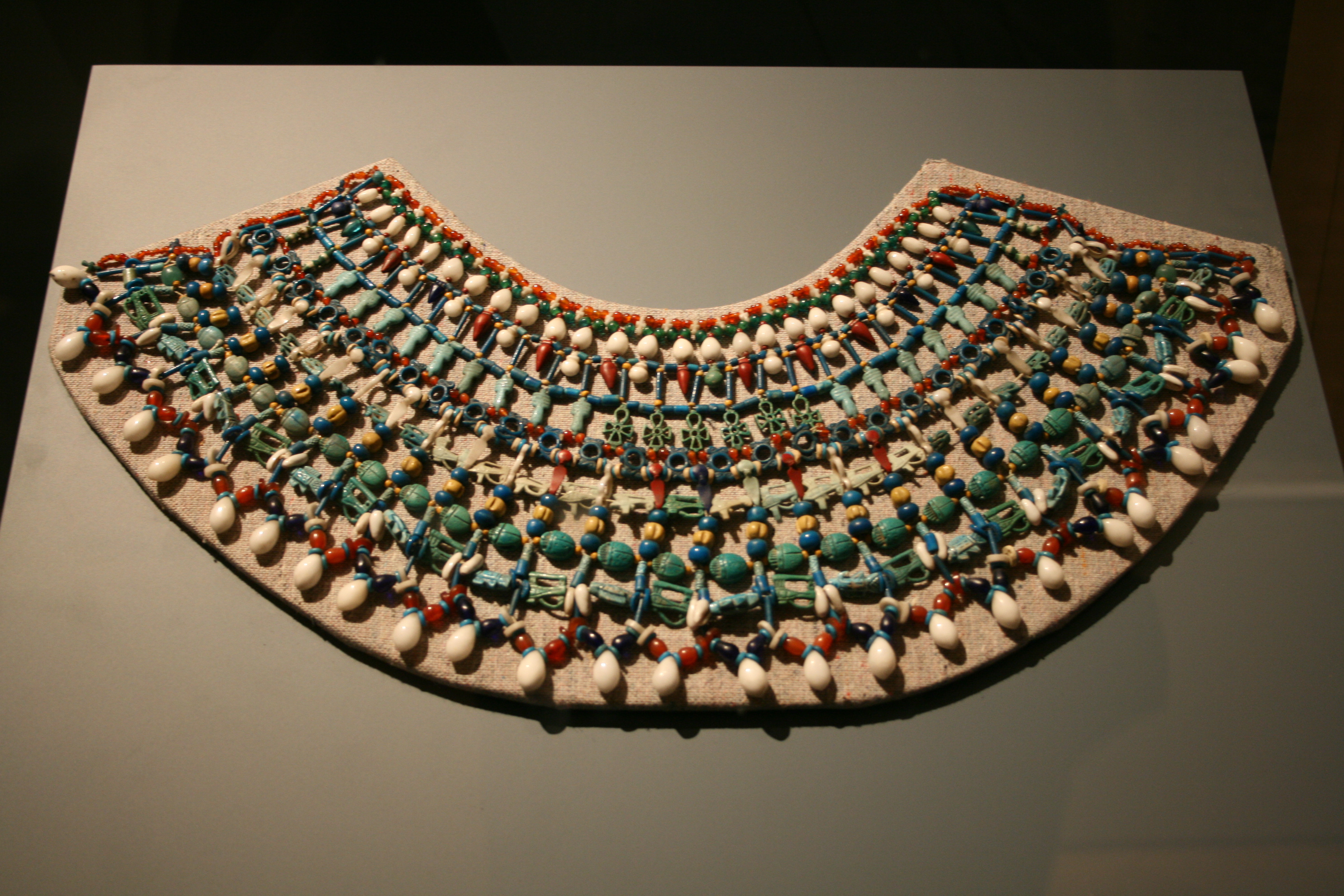
A reconstructed usekh from beads found in the tomb.

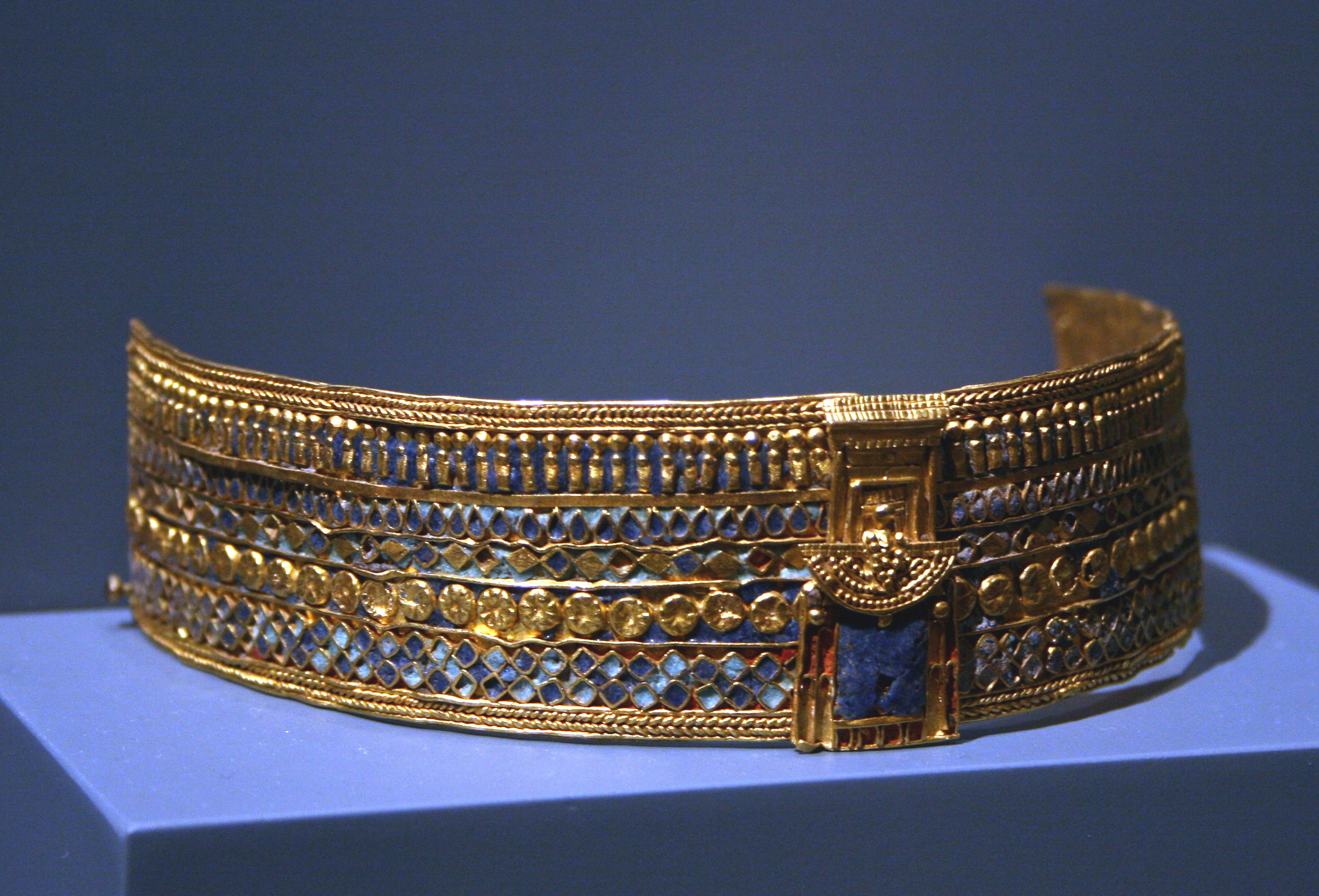
A bracelet with the god Amun inside a shrine.

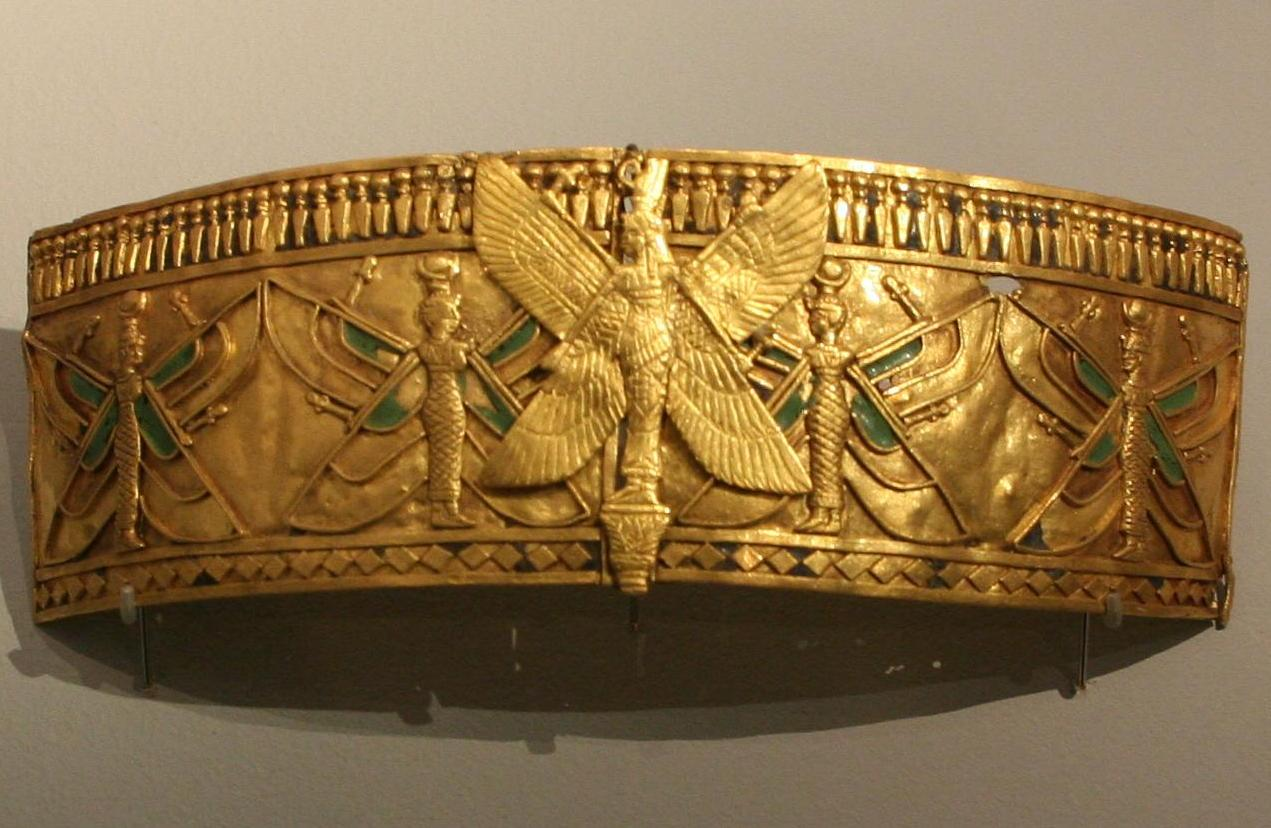
A bracelet with a winged goddess.

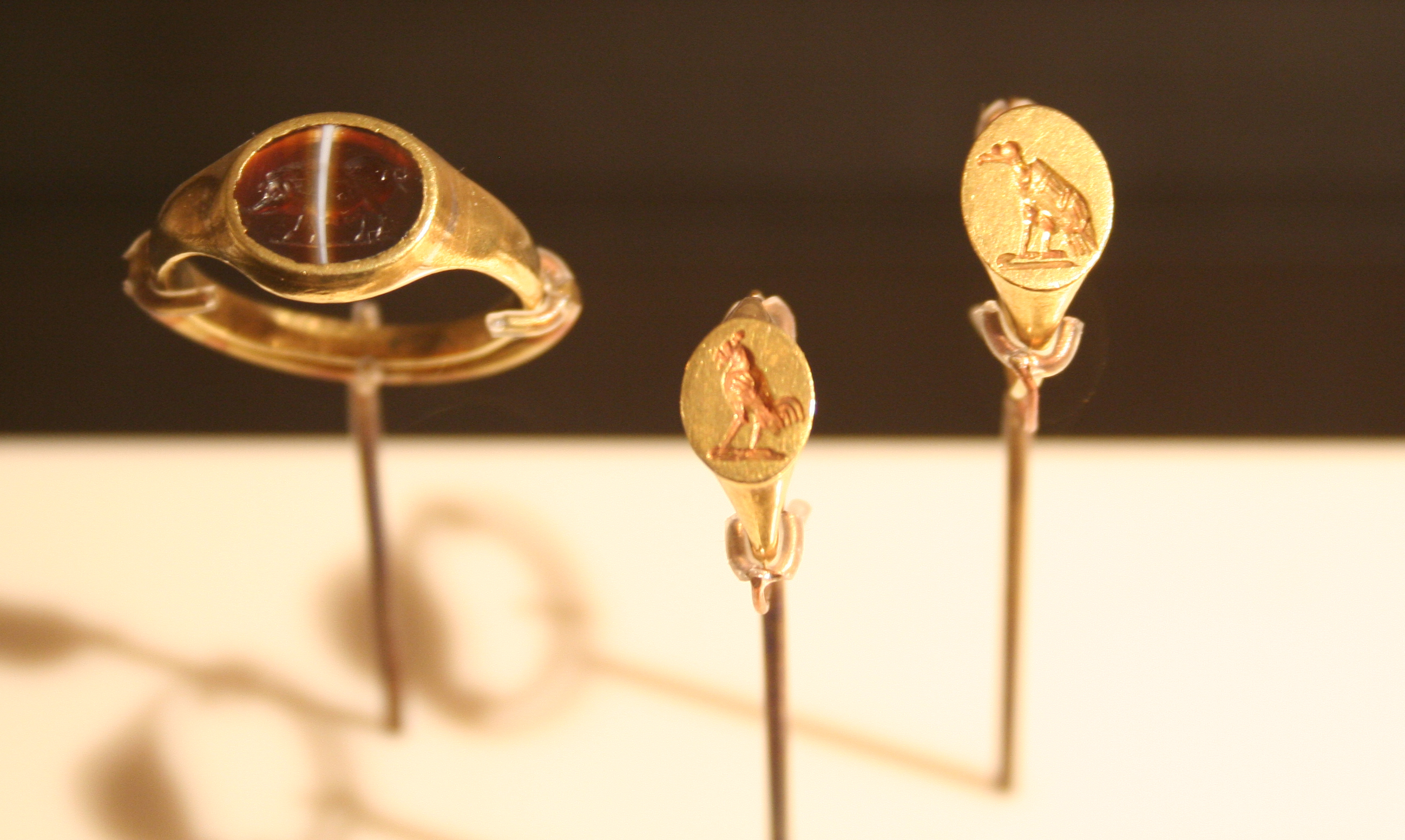
Various golden rings.

Ferlini died in Bologna on 30 December 1870, and was buried in the Certosa di Bologna. He had married twice and had a daughter, Clytemnestra, with his second wife. She inherited his father's collection of antiquities and papers, including a manuscript about his archaeological research in Africa, which was published posthomously.

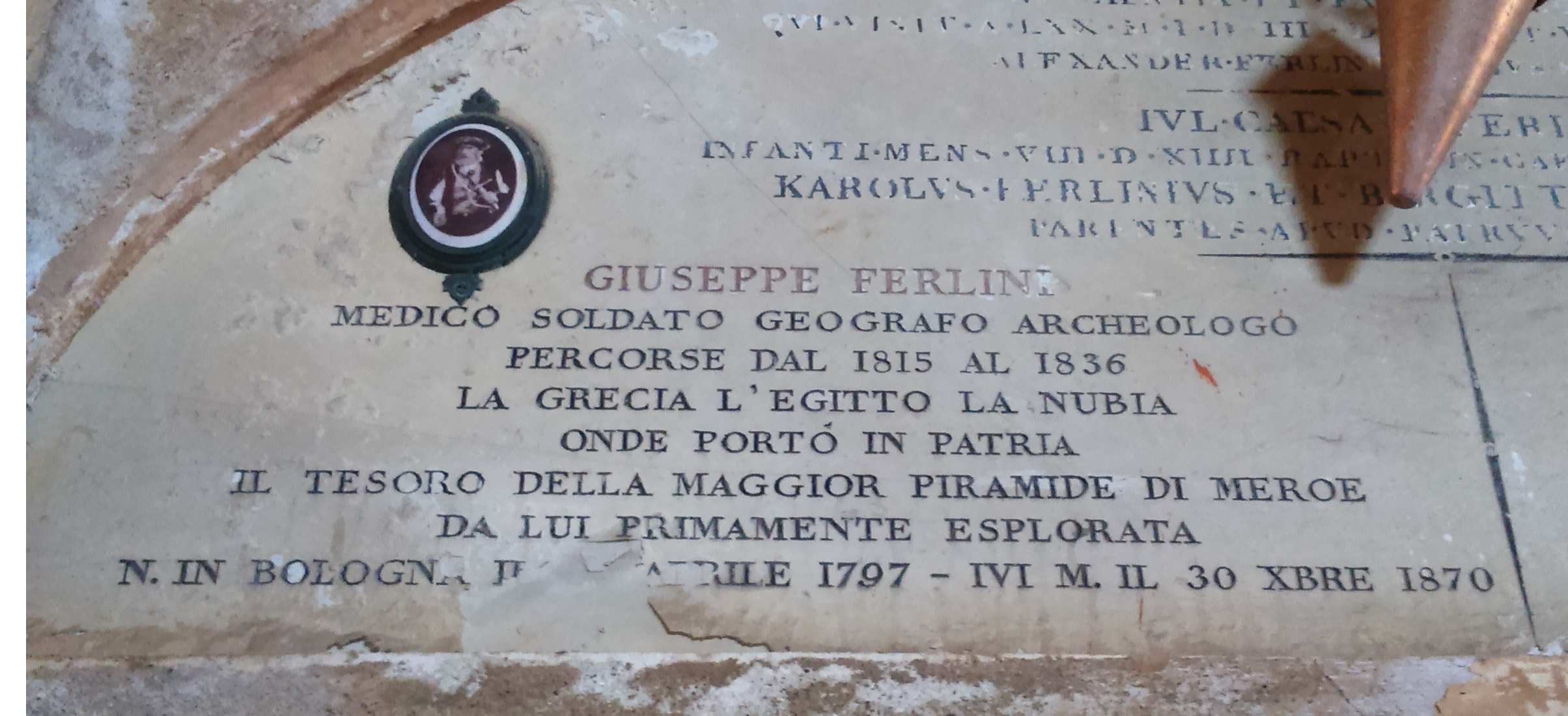
Ferlini's tomb in Certosa di Bologna where he is credited for bringing the treasure of Amnishakheto to Italy

== Works ==
- Cenno sugli scavi operati nella Nubia e Catalogo degli oggetti ritrovati. Bologna: Nobili. 1837.
- Relation historique des fouilles operés dans la Nubie..., suivie d'un catalogue des objets ... trouvés dans l'une des 47 Pyramides aux environs de l'ancienne ville de Meroe. Rome: Salviucci. 1838.
- Walter Boldrini, ed. (1981). Nell'interno dell'Affrica, 1829-1835. Bologna: Ponte Nuovo.

== Bibliography ==
- Lepsius, Carl Richard (1852). Discoveries in Egypt, Ethiopia and the Peninsula of Sinai, in the Years 1842-1845, During the Mission Sent Out by His Majesty Frederick William IV. of Prussia. London: R. Bentley.
- Mormino, Giuseppe (1959). "Giuseppe Ferlini e le sue scoperte in Egitto". Africa: Rivista trimestrale di studi e documentazione dell'Istituto italiano per l'Africa e l'Oriente. 14 (1): 35–37. JSTOR 40757026.
- Markowitz, Yvonne; Lacovara, Peter (1996). "The Ferlini Treasure in Archeological Perspective". Journal of the American Research Center in Egypt. 33: 1–9. doi:10.2307/40000601.
- Fagioli Vercellone, Guido (1996). "FERLINI, Giuseppe". Dizionario Biografico degli Italiani (in Italian). Vol. 46: Feducci–Ferrerio. Rome: Istituto dell'Enciclopedia Italiana. ISBN 978-88-12-00032-6.
- Miniaci, Gianluca (2024). "The adventurous life of Giuseppe Ferlini". In Gianluca Miniaci; Christian Greco; Paolo Del Vesco; Mattia Mancini; Cristina Alù (eds.). Egypt in ancient and modern tales, travels and explorations: studies presented to Marilina Betrò. Pisa: Pisa University Press. pp. 123–132. doi:10.2307/jj.26526664.16.
