= Ethiopian eunuch =

Figure in the New Testament's Acts chapter 8

Saint Djan Darada
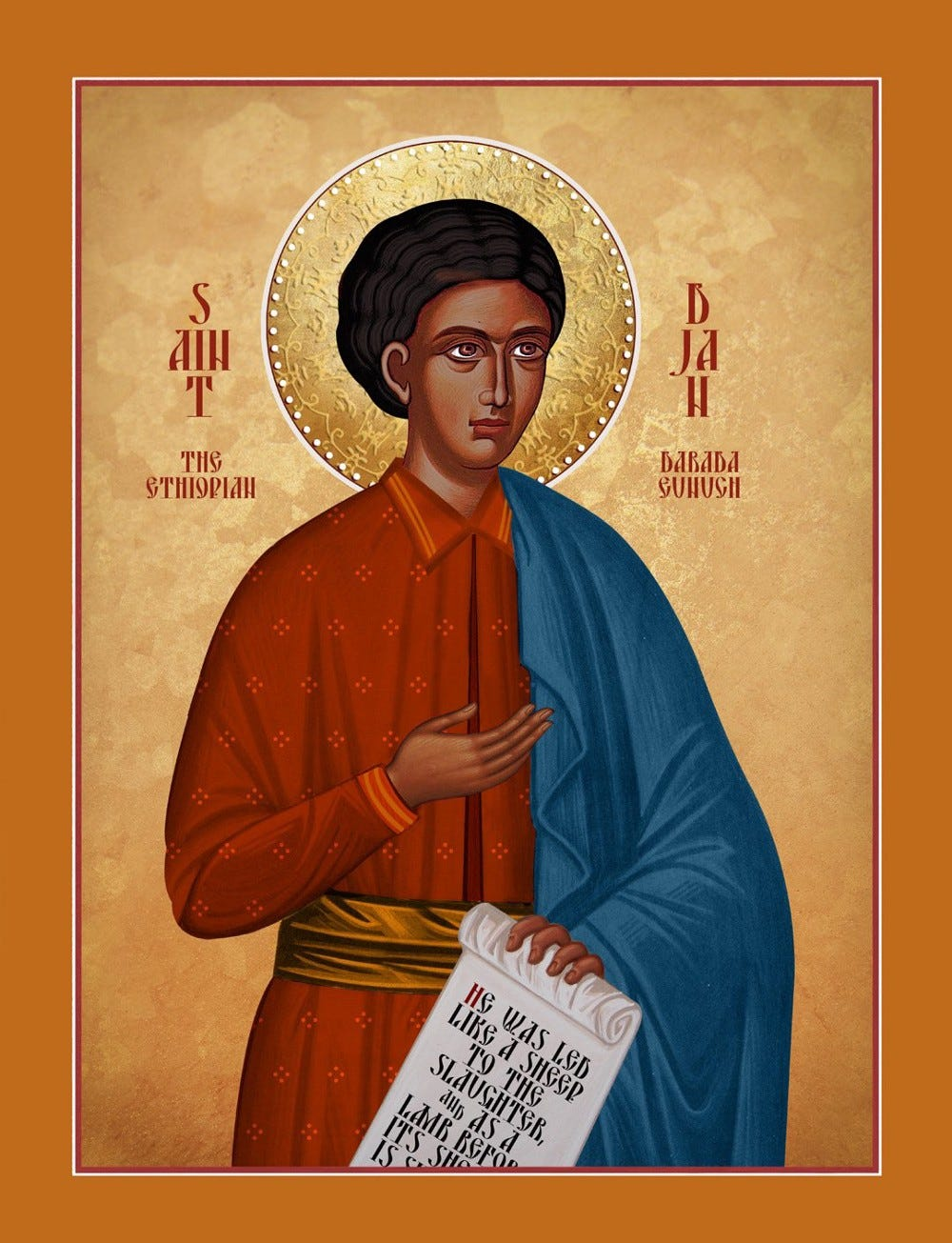

Ethiopian Eunuch Martyr
- Born: Unknown c. 1st century BC or 1st century AD presumably Ethiopia
- Venerated in: Eastern Orthodox Church; Oriental Orthodoxy (Ethiopian Orthodox Tewahedo Church); Protestantism (Episcopal Church)
- Feast: 4 January, 17 June, and 27 August (in the Eastern Orthodox Church)

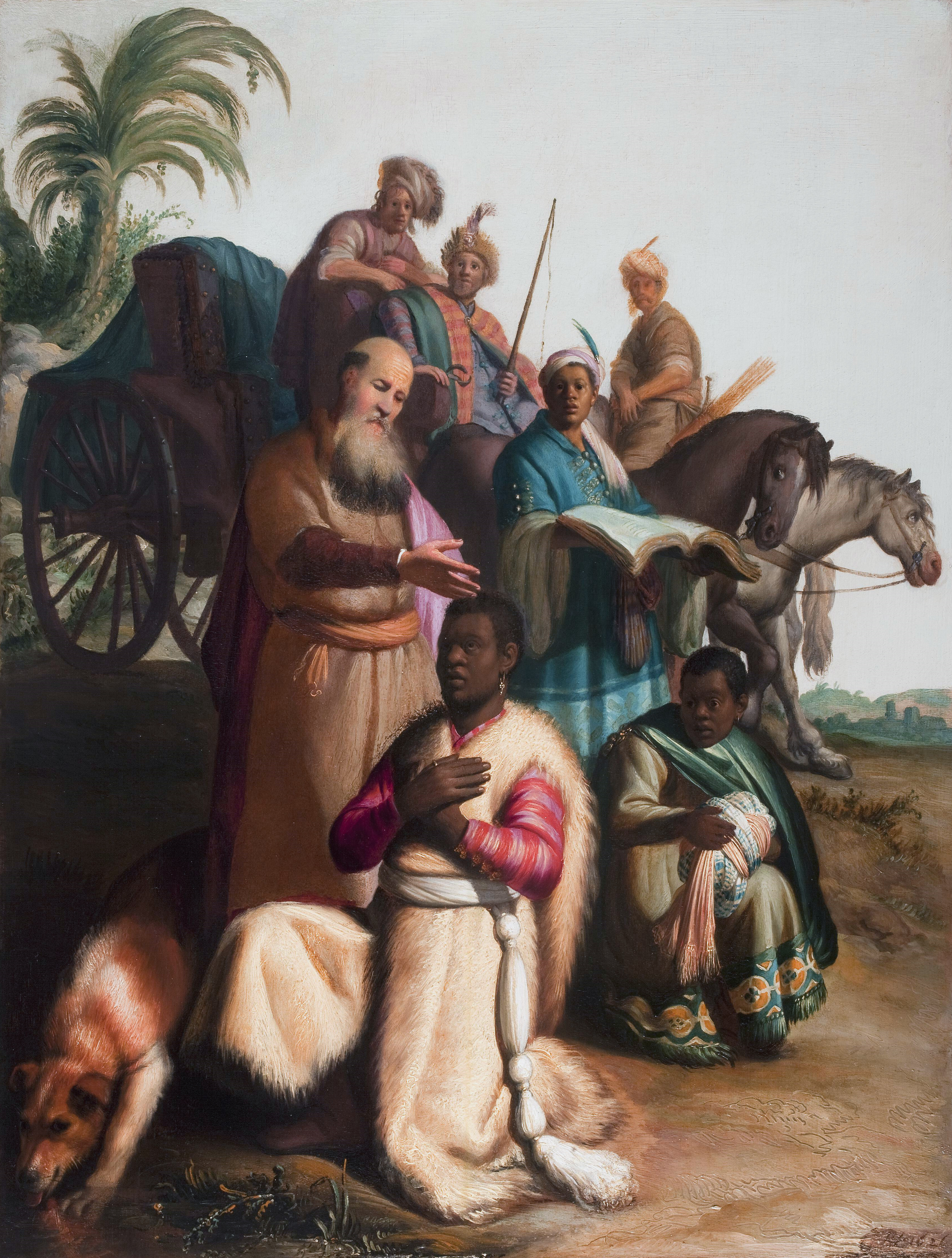
Rembrandt, The Baptism of the Eunuch, c. 1626

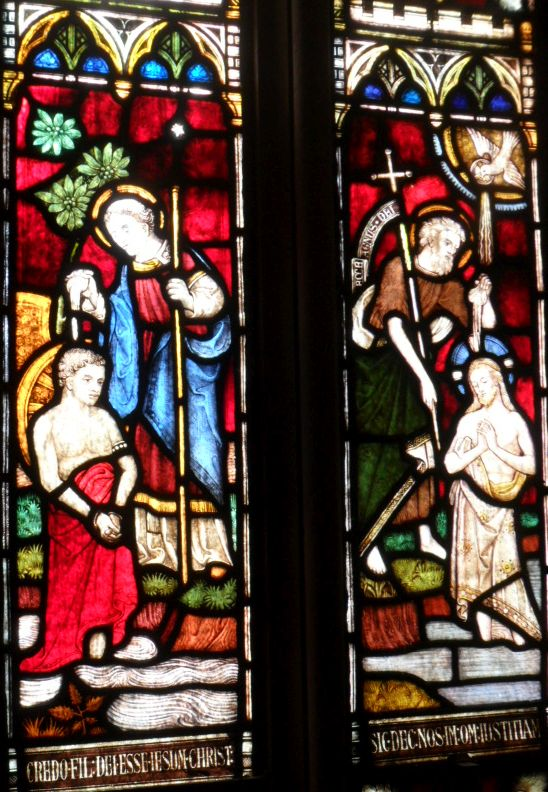
A stained glass diptych showing the baptisms of the Ethiopian eunuch by St. Philip the Evangelist and of Jesus Christ by St. John the Baptist, from the Cathedral of the Incarnation (Garden City, New York)

The Ethiopian eunuch, also called Djan Darada (Russian: Джан Дарада) or Simeon Bakos, is a figure in the New Testament of the Bible. Recognized as an early Christian saint, his feast days are on 4 January, 17 June, and on 27 August, respective to different Christian denominations. The story of his conversion to Christianity at the preaching of Philip the Evangelist is recounted in Acts 8. He is a foundational figure of the Ethiopian Orthodox Tewahedo Church.

== Biblical narrative ==
Philip the Evangelist was told by an angel to go to the road from Jerusalem to Gaza, and there he encountered the Ethiopian eunuch, the treasurer of Candace, Queen of the Ethiopians (Ancient Greek: Κανδάκη, "Candace" was the Meroitic term for "queen" or possibly "royal woman"). The eunuch had been to Jerusalem to worship and was returning home. Sitting in his chariot, he was reading the Book of Isaiah, specifically Isaiah 53:7–8. Philip asked the Ethiopian, "Do you understand what you are reading?" He said he did not ("How can I understand unless I have a teacher to teach me?"), and asked Philip to explain the text to him. Philip told him the Gospel of Jesus, and the Ethiopian asked to be baptized. They went down into a water source, traditionally thought to be the Dhirweh fountain near Halhul, and Philip baptized him.

In the King James Version and the Catholic Douay-Rheims Version, the Ethiopian says, "I believe that Jesus Christ is the Son of God" (verse 37), but this is omitted in most modern versions. D.A. Hubbard suggests that confession is "not supported in the better manuscripts [i.e. the Alexandrian text-type])", although the Ethiopian is still "one of the outstanding converts in Acts."

After this, Philip was suddenly taken away by the Spirit of the Lord, and the eunuch "went on his way rejoicing" (verse 39).

== Christian traditions ==
Church Father St. Irenaeus of Lyons in his book Adversus haereses (Against the Heresies, an early anti-Gnostic theological work) 3:12:8 (180 AD), wrote regarding the Ethiopian eunuch, "This man (Simeon Bachos the Eunuch) was also sent into the regions of Ethiopia, to preach what he had himself believed, that there was one God preached by the prophets, but that the Son of this (God) had already made (His) appearance in human flesh, and had been led as a sheep to the slaughter; and all the other statements which the prophets made regarding Him." In Ethiopian Orthodox Tewahedo tradition he was referred to as Bachos and is known as an Ethiopian Jew with the name Simeon also called the Black, a name used in Acts 13:1.

One of the traditional sites of the baptism is the Dhirweh fountain, near Halhul. Others place the traditional site of baptism at the Ein Hanya Spring.

== Assessment and interpretation ==
=== Religion ===
The Ethiopian eunuch's religion of origin is significant because of the subsequent implications of his conversion to Christianity. There are many competing theories for the eunuch's pre-conversion religious status in relation to Judaism and Christianity.

Religious Status	Evidence	Supporters
Jew	After the story of the Ethiopian eunuch, Irenaeus wrote, "Conversion is more difficult with gentiles than with Jews," indicating that the eunuch was a Jew. Charles Francis Potter suggested the eunuch may have been an Essene.	Pontius (died c. 260), Irenaeus (c. 130 – 202)
Jew-Gentile	Eunuch occupies an "intermediary position between Jew and gentile", which could indicate the status of proselyte or God-fearer.	Jerome (c. 347 – 420)
Gentile	Eunuch must have been a Gentile because he was Ethiopian.	Eusebius (c. 275 – 339), Ephrem the Syrian (c. 306 – 373), Bede (c. 672 – 725), Nicephorus Callistus (c. 1256 – 1335), Nicholas of Lyra (c. 1270 – 1349), and Martin Luther (1483–1546)
proselyte	Eunuch "must be read as a proselyte (a full convert to Judaism) since Acts presents Cornelius the Centurion as the first gentile to be baptized into the Christian community."	D. A Hubbard, Lancelot Andrewes (1555–1626), John Calvin (1509–1564), John Wesley (1703–1791)
God-fearer	Eunuch cannot have been a proselyte and must have been a God-fearer "since Deut 23:1 would have prohibited a castrated male from becoming a proselyte."	Paul Mumo Kisau, C. K. Barrett, Justo L. González, many other contemporary scholars.

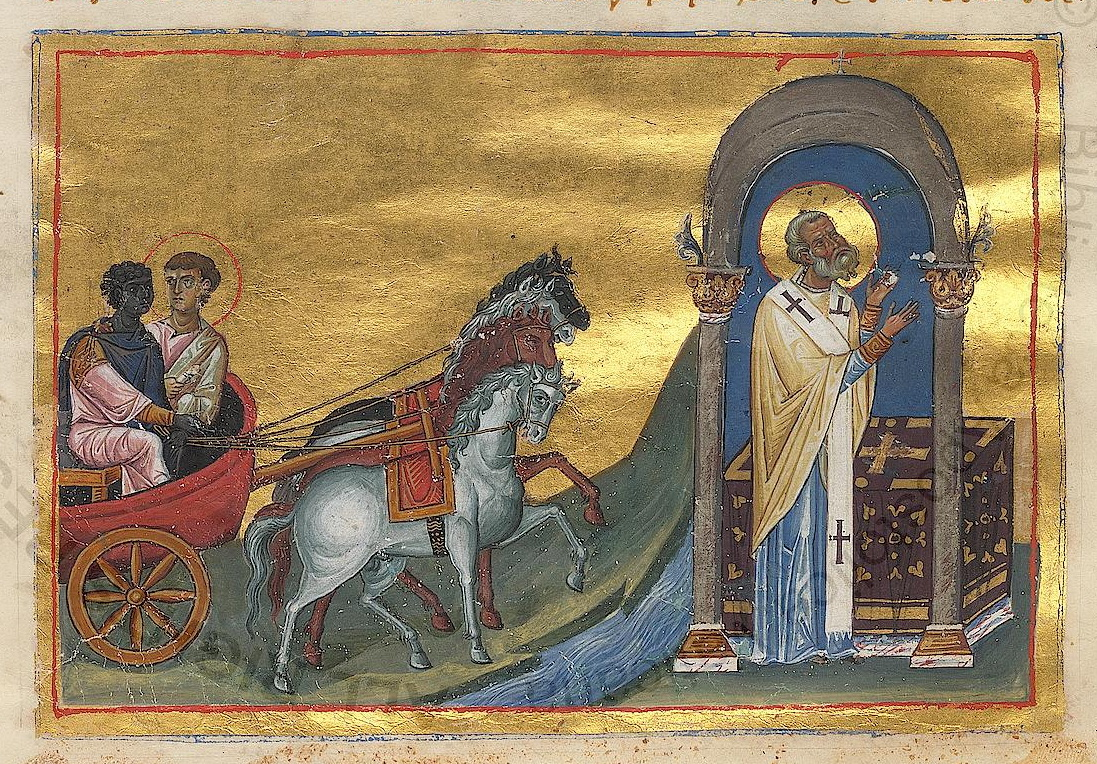
Illustration from the Menologion of Basil II of Philip and the Ethiopian eunuch

Modern scholarship tends to place the Ethiopian eunuch in the "intermediate position between Jew and Gentile." Scott Shauf suggests that the "primary point of the story is about carrying the gospel to the end of the earth, not about establishing a mission to Gentiles," and thus Luke "does not bring the Gentile status of the Ethiopian into the foreground." However, "the suggestion that the eunuch is or at least might be a Gentile in the story, by both his ethnic and possibly physical description" may leave more formative possibility than if he had been explicitly categorized. Ernst Haenchen builds on Ferdinand Christian Baur's work (1792–1860) in concluding that "the author of Acts made the eunuch's religious identity ambiguous intentionally" so as to preserve the tradition that claimed Cornelius as the first Gentile convert as well as the tradition that claimed the Ethiopian eunuch as the first Gentile convert.

=== Sexuality ===
Commentators generally suggest that the combination of "eunuch" together with the title "court official" indicates a literal eunuch, who would have been excluded from the Temple by the restriction in Deuteronomy 23:1. Some scholars point out that eunuchs were excluded from Jewish worship and extend the New Testament's inclusion of these men to other sexual minorities, such as biblical scholar Karen Keen, who writes that "We don’t know Bakos’s sexual orientation or gender identity. But we do know he was a sexual minority. He was unable to conform to physical and social norms expected of males." John J. McNeill, a gay Catholic priest, citing non-literal uses of "eunuch" in other New Testament passages such as Matthew 19:12, writes that he likes to think of the eunuch as "the first baptized gay Christian," while Jack Rogers writes that "the fact that the first Gentile convert to Christianity is from a sexual minority and a different race, ethnicity and nationality together" calls Christians to be radically inclusive and welcoming.

=== Race and origins ===
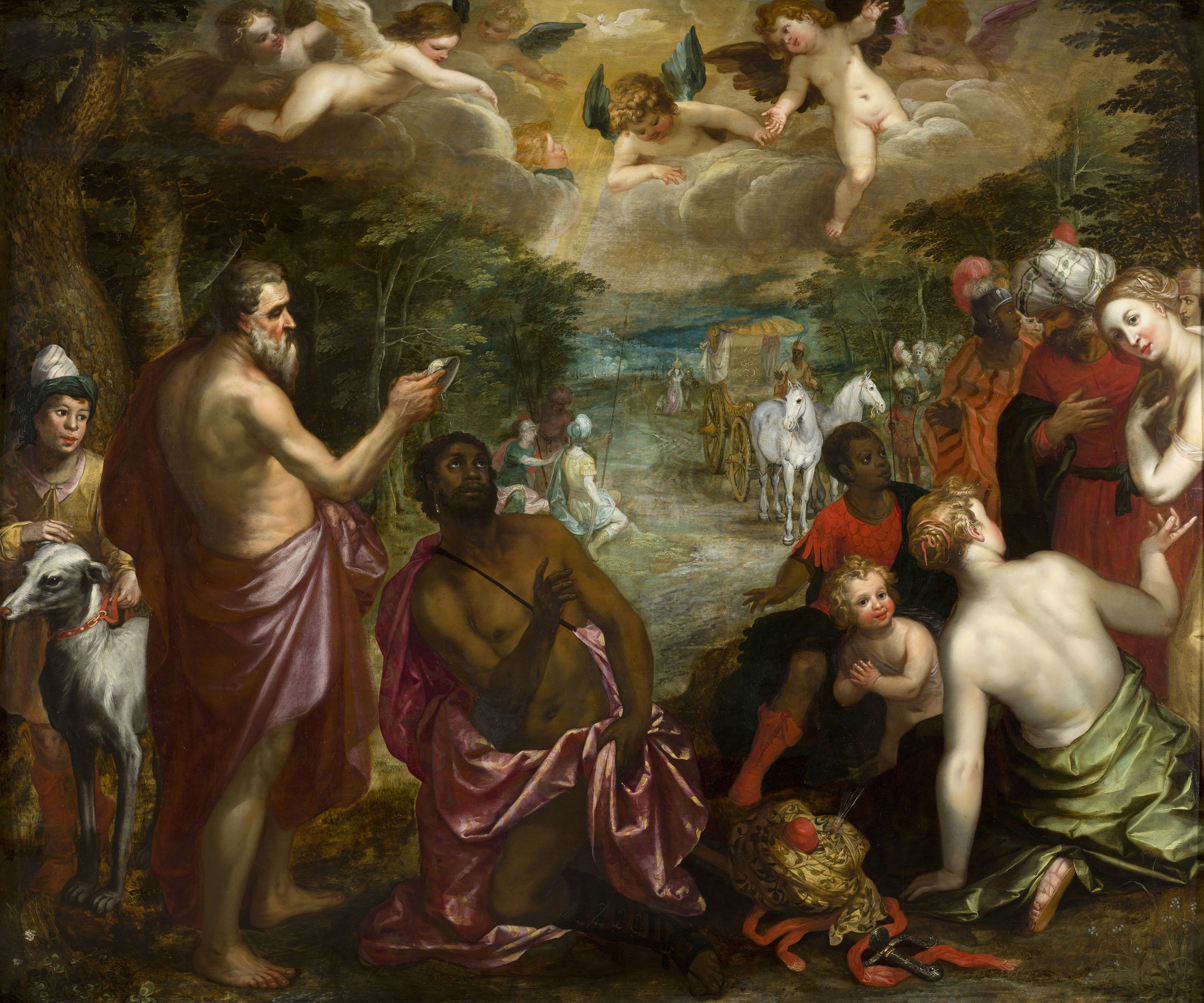
The Baptism of Queen Candace's Eunuch (c. 1625–1630, attributed to Hendrick van Balen and Jan Brueghel the Younger)

"Candace" was the name given in Greco-Roman historiography to all the female rulers or consorts of the Kingdom of Kush (now part of Sudan). The capital city was Meroë, and the title of "Candace" derives from a Meroitic word, kdke, that referred to any royal woman. "Ethiopian" was a Greek term for black-skinned peoples generally, often applied to Kush (which was well known to the Hebrews and often mentioned in the Hebrew Bible). The eunuch was not from the land today known as Ethiopia, which corresponds to the ancient Kingdom of Aksum, which conquered Kush in the fourth century. The first writer to call it Ethiopia was Philostorgius around 440.

Some scholars, such as Frank M. Snowden, Jr., interpret the story as emphasizing that early Christian communities accepted members regardless of race: "Ethiopians were the yardstick by which antiquity measured colored peoples." Others, such as Clarice Martin, write that it is a commentary on the religion rather than on its adherents, showing Christianity's geographical extent; Gay L. Byron goes further, saying, "The Ethiopian eunuch was used by Luke to indicate that salvation could extend even to Ethiopians and Blacks." David Tuesday Adamo suggests that the word used here (Αἰθίοψ, aithiops) is best translated simply as "African."

=== Related figures ===
C. K. Barrett contrasts the Ethiopian eunuch's story with that of Cornelius the Centurion, another convert. He notes that while the Ethiopian continues on his journey home and passes out of the narrative, Cornelius and his followers form another church in Judea, and speculates that this reflects a desire to focus on Peter rather than Philip. Robert O'Toole argues that the way Philip is taken away parallels the way Jesus disappears after he has been talking to the disciples on the road to Emmaus in Luke 24.

There are literary parallels between the story of the Ethiopian eunuch in Acts and that of Ebed-Melech, an Ethiopian character portrayed as a eunuch in some manuscripts (but not the Septuagint version) of the Book of Jeremiah.
