= Kandake =

Title of queenmothers in ancient Nubia

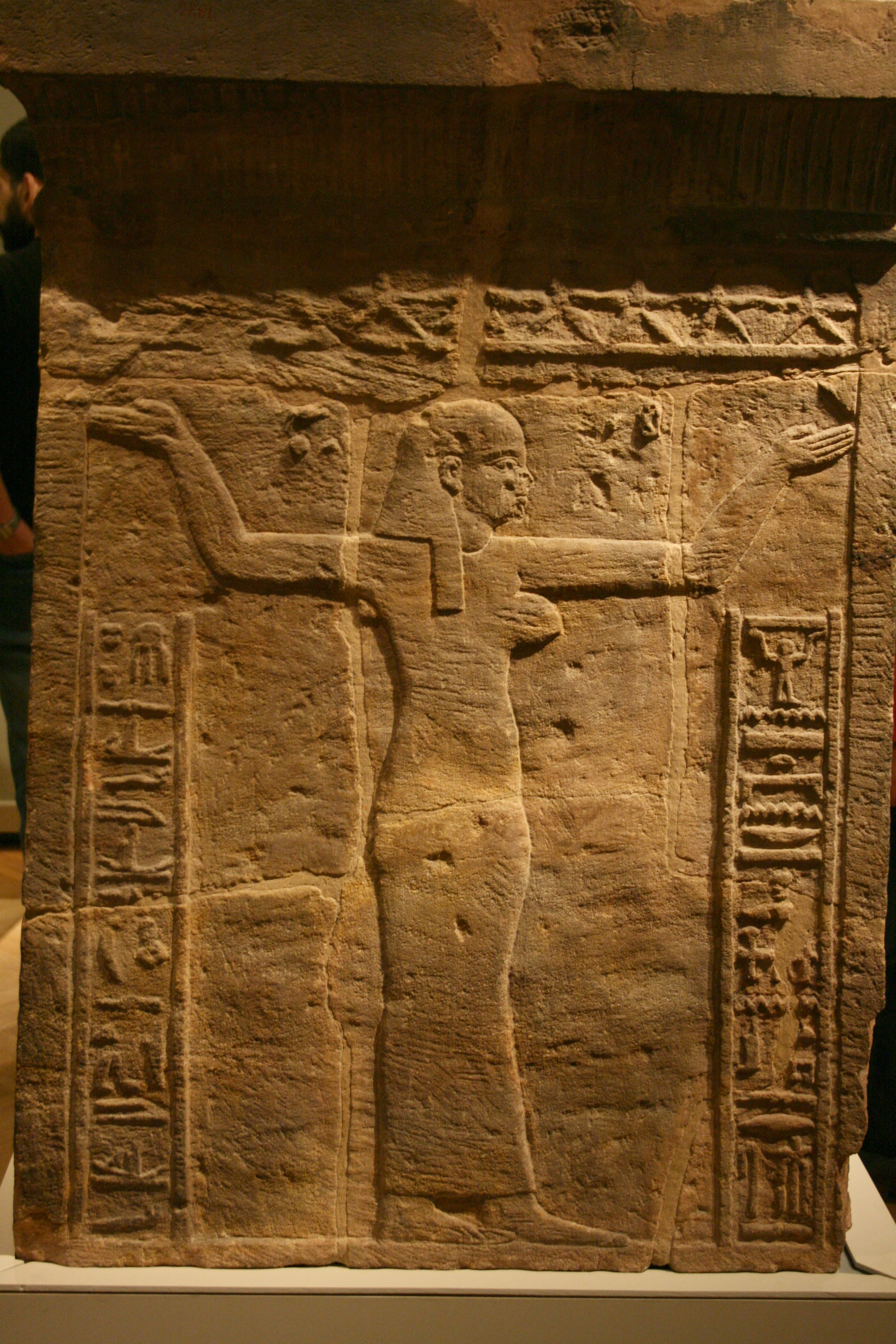
Relief depicting Kandake Amanitore

Kandake, kadake or kentake (Meroitic: 𐦲𐦷𐦲𐦡, romanized: kdke), often Latinised as Candace (Ancient Greek: Κανδάκη, romanized: Kandákē), was one Meroitic term for a queen or queen mother of Kingdom of Kush. It is attested for six or seven women. Some were rulers, while others were most likely just wives of a king. In some cases, she may have been sister or close female relative of the king of Kush, she also could be the queen mother. She sometimes had her own court, possibly acted as a landholder and held a secular role as regent until her son came of age. A kandake who ruled in her own right bore in addition the title qore, the same title carried by male rulers. Contemporary Greek and Roman sources treated it, incorrectly, as a name. The name Candace is derived from the way the word is used in the New Testament (Acts 8:27).

== Archaeological sources ==
The Kandakes of Meroë were first described through the Greek geographer's Strabo account of the "one-eyed Candace" in 23 BCE in his encyclopedia Geographica. There are at least ten regnant Meroitic queens during the 500 years between 260 BCE and 320 CE, and at least six during the 140 periods between 60 BC and 80 AD. The iconography of the Meroitic queens often depicts them alone and at the forefront of their stelae and sculptures, wearing regal clothing. Early depictions of Kushite queens typically do not have Egyptian elements, making their appearance drastically different from their Kushite male and Egyptian counterparts. As seen in the Dream Stela of Tanawetamani, a large shawl was wrapped around the body with an additionally decorated cloak worn over the first; typically, a small tab-like element hanging below the hem touches the ground and has been interpreted as a little tail. The first association with this element of dress is with Tarharqo's mother during his coronation ceremony.

It was not until George Reisner excavated the royal cemeteries at El Kurru and Nuri in 1917-19 that archaeological material became available for studying Kushite queenship. Additionally, a few royal tombs of Kushite women have been found at Meroe's cemetery and in Egypt at Abydos (Leahy 1994). At El Kurru, six pyramids belong to royal women of the 25th Dynasty and a pyramid for queen Qalhata of the Napatan period. At Nuri, the tombs of royal women are located on the west plateau, with more inscriptional information available at the site, linking the roles that the kings' mothers played in succession and their importance during the Kushite dynasty.

The most important event that Kushite women participated in was kingship's ensured continuity, where royal women were mentioned and represented in the royal ceremony. The lunettes of the stelae of Tanawetamani, Harsiyotef, and Nastasen all provide iconographic and textual evidence of these kings' enthronement. In all of these stelae, the king is accompanied by a female member of his family, mother, and wife. The king's mother played an essential role in the legitimacy of her son as the king; textual evidence from Taharqo's coronation stelae represents inscriptional evidence suggesting that the king's mother traveled to her son's coronation. During the Kushite 25th Dynasty, the office that was known as God's Wife of Amun was established. The royal women in this role acted as the primary contact with the Kushite god Amun. They played a decisive role in the king's accession to the throne.

Bas-reliefs dated to about 170 B.C. reveal the kentake Shanakdakheto, dressed in armor and wielding a spear in battle. She did not rule as queen regent or queen mother, but as a fully independent ruler. Her husband was her consort. In bas-reliefs found in the ruins of building projects she commissioned, Shanakdakheto is portrayed both alone as well as with her husband and son, who would inherit the throne upon her death.

== Greco-Roman sources ==
Pliny writes that the "Queen of the "Aethiopians" bore the title Candace, and indicates that Kush had conquered ancient Syria and the Mediterranean.

In 25 BC the Kush kandake Amanirenas, as reported by Strabo, attacked the city of Syene, today's Aswan, in territory of the Roman Empire; Emperor Augustus destroyed the city of Napata in retaliation.

Cassius Dio wrote that Kandake's army advanced as far as the Elephantine in Egypt, but Petronius defeated them and took Napata, their capital, and other cities.

Four African queens were known to the Greco-Roman world as the "Candaces": Amanishakheto, Amanirenas, Nawidemak, and Malegereabar.

== Biblical usage ==
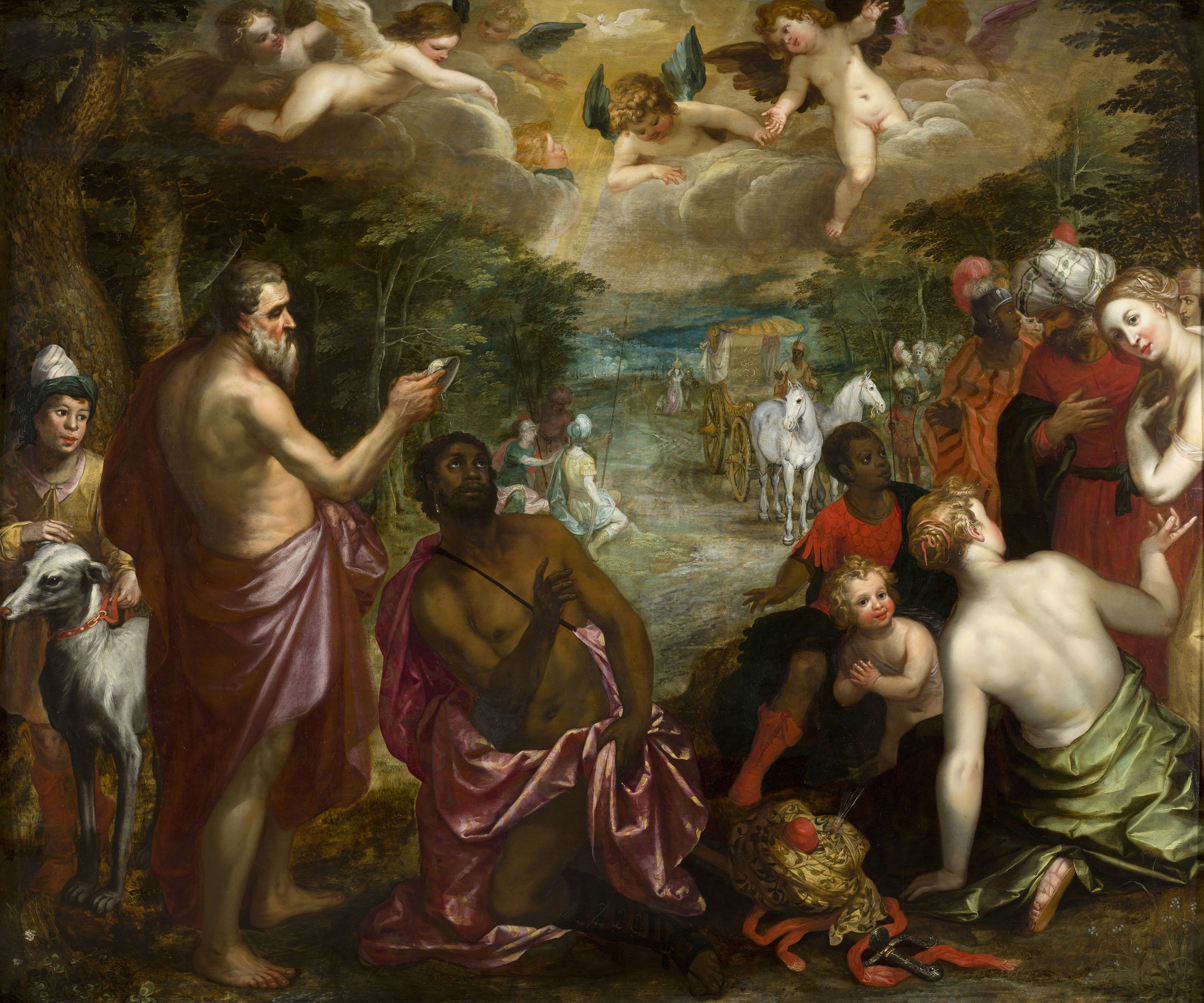
The Baptism of Queen Candace's Eunuch (c. 1625–30, attributed to Hendrick van Balen and Jan Brueghel the Younger)

In the New Testament, a treasury official of "Candace, queen of the Aethiopians", returning from a trip to Jerusalem, met with Philip the Evangelist:

Now an angel of the Lord said to Philip, "Rise and go toward the south to the road that goes down from Jerusalem to Gaza." This is a desert place. And he rose and went. And there was an Aethiopian eunuch, a court official of Candace, queen of the Aethiopians, who was in charge of all her treasure. He had come to Jerusalem to worship

He discussed with Philip the meaning of a perplexing passage from the Book of Isaiah. Philip explained the scripture to him and he was promptly baptised in some nearby water. The eunuch 'went on his way, rejoicing', and presumably therefore reported back on his conversion to the Kandake.

== Ethiopian legend ==
The Ethiopian royal legend and chronicles contain references to queens said to carry title Kandake. Though these references do not originate in contemporary inscriptions or Ethiopian royal titles but appear in later literary traditions, particularly Kebra Nagast (14th century CE) and post-conquest Solomonic texts. There is no archaeological or epigraphic evidence that title “Kandake” was used historically within Ethiopia.

Ethiopia’s dynastic tradition claims a lineage stretching back to before 1000 BCE, culminating in reign of Emperor Haile Selassie, who was deposed in 1974. The official genealogy, as recorded in legendary sources, traces monarchy to Menelik I, said to be son of King Solomon and Makeda, the Queen of Sheba. The following queens from the king list have "Kandake" added to their name:

- Nicauta Kandake (r. 740–730 BCE)
- Nikawla Kandake II (r. 342–332 BCE)
- Akawsis Kandake III (r. 325–315 BCE)
- Nikosis Kandake IV (r. 242–232 BCE)
- Nicotnis Kandake V (r. 35–25 BCE)
- Garsemot Kandake VI (r. 40–50 CE) – Allegedly the queen who ruled during Biblical story of the Ethiopian eunuch. This association is based on later interpretation, not on direct historical sources.

Claims that twenty-one queens ruled Ethiopia as sole regents until 9th century CE are found in Ethiopian oral traditions and chronicled king lists, but are not verified in inscriptions or contemporary records from Aksumite or pre-Aksumite period.

According to historians, the conquest of Meroë by King Ezana in the 4th century CE may have inspired later political fictions, in which Axumite rulers retroactively claimed connections to Kushite traditions. This included adoption of the Greek term “Aithiops” (Αἰθίοψ), a classical translation of "Cush" (כּוּשׁ) from the Hebrew Bible, originally used by Greco-Roman writers to describe the Kingdom of Kush and people of Nubia, whose civilization predated the rise of Axum by nearly two millennia. This cultural absorption helped shape Solomonic legitimacy and Ethiopian court ideology in the medieval period.

== Alexandrian legend ==
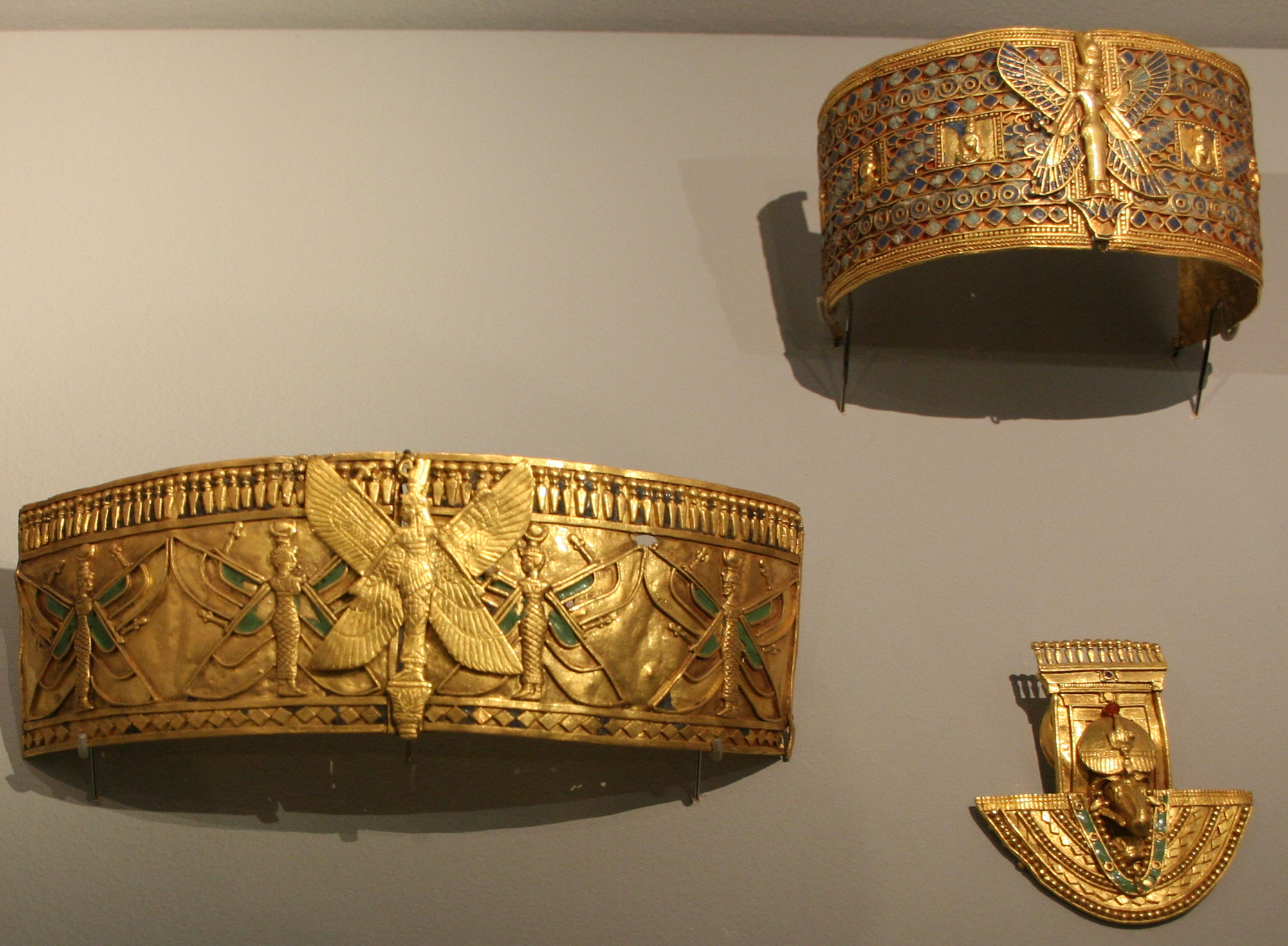
Jewellery of Kandake Amanishakheto, from her tomb

A legend in the Alexander romance claims that "Candace of Meroë" fought Alexander the Great. In fact, Alexander never attacked Nubia and never attempted to move further south than the oasis of Siwa in Egypt. The story is that when Alexander attempted to conquer her lands in 332 BC, she arranged her armies strategically to meet him and was present on a war elephant when he approached. Having assessed the strength of her armies, Alexander decided to withdraw from Nubia, heading to Egypt instead. Another story, as evident in the literary retelling of the life of Alexander provided by the Middle High German epic Straßburger Alexander from ca. 1150, claims that Alexander and Candace had a romantic encounter.

These accounts originate from Alexander Romance by an unknown writer called Pseudo-Callisthenes, and the work is largely a fictionalized and grandiose account of Alexander's life. It is commonly quoted, but there seems to be no historical reference to this event from Alexander's time. The whole story of Alexander and Candace's encounter appears to be legendary.

John Malalas has mixed the Pseudo-Callisthenes material with other and wrote about the affair of Alexander with Kandake, adding that they got married. Malalas also wrote that Kandake was an Indian queen and Alexander met her during his Indian campaign.

== List of ruling queens ==
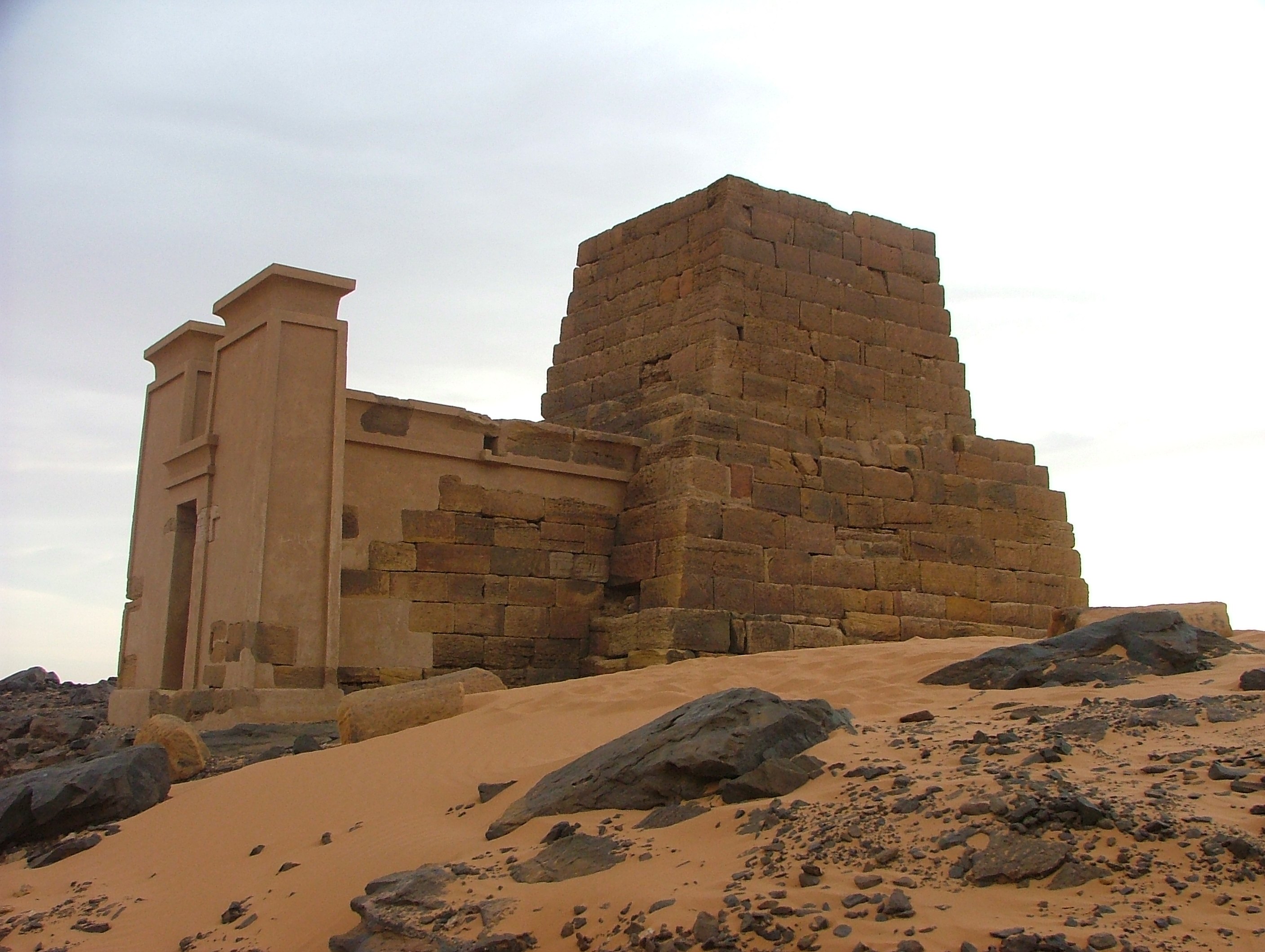
Pyramid of Amanitore in modern day Sudan

At least eleven queens also ruled in their own right as monarchs (i.e. queens regnant) of Kush:

The following list contains all Nubian women that were most likely ruling as a king (qore). Only six or seven of them are attested with the title Kandake

- Bartare, buried at Meroo in pyramid Beg. S 10, non ruling queen with title Kandake
- Sar...tin, buried at Meroo in pyramid Beg. S 4, non ruling queen with title Kandake
- Nahirqo (middle 2nd century BC)
- An unknown queen regnant (end of the 2nd–first half of the 1st century BC)
- Amanirenas (end of the 1st century BC–beginning of the 1st century AD) she was also Kandake
- Amanishakheto (early 1st century AD) she was also Kandake
- Shanakdakhete (first half of the 1st century AD)
- Nawidemak (first half of the 1st century AD?)
- Amanitore (middle 1st century AD) she was also Kandake
- Amanikhatashan (middle 2nd century AD?)
- Amanikhalika (second half of the 2nd century AD)
- Patrapeamani (early 4th century)
- Amanipilade (mid-4th century)

Based on the reading of a single inscription, some lists give two later kandakes named Maloqorebar (266–283 AD) and Lahideamani (306-314 AD). A recently discovered inscription corrects this earlier reading, however, showing that neither was a woman.

== See also ==
- Kandake of the Sudanese Revolution

== Sources ==
- Harris, G.L.A. (2014). Living Legends and Full Agency: Implications of Repealing the Combat Exclusion Policy. CRC Press. ISBN 978-1-4665-1378-5.
