= Meroitic =

Meroitic may refer to:

- things related to the city and kingdom of Meroë in pre-Islamic Sudan
- Meroitic alphabet
- Meroitic language
