= Meroitic Cursive (Unicode block) =

- Range: U+109A0..U+109FF (96 code points)
- Plane: SMP
- Scripts: Meroitic Cursive
- Major alphabets: Meroitic
- Assigned: 90 code points
- Unused: 6 reserved code points

Unicode version history
- 6.1 (2012): 26 (+26)
- 8.0 (2015): 90 (+64)

Unicode documentation
- Code chart ∣ Web page

Meroitic Cursive is a Unicode block containing demotic-style characters for writing the Meroitic language.

Meroitic Cursive^{[1]}^{[2]} Official Unicode Consortium code chart (PDF)
| | 0 | 1 | 2 | 3 | 4 | 5 | 6 | 7 | 8 | 9 | A | B | C | D | E | F |
| U+109Ax | 𐦠 | 𐦡 | 𐦢 | 𐦣 | 𐦤 | 𐦥 | 𐦦 | 𐦧 | 𐦨 | 𐦩 | 𐦪 | 𐦫 | 𐦬 | 𐦭 | 𐦮 | 𐦯 |
| U+109Bx | 𐦰 | 𐦱 | 𐦲 | 𐦳 | 𐦴 | 𐦵 | 𐦶 | 𐦷 | | | | | 𐦼 | 𐦽 | 𐦾 | 𐦿 |
| U+109Cx | 𐧀 | 𐧁 | 𐧂 | 𐧃 | 𐧄 | 𐧅 | 𐧆 | 𐧇 | 𐧈 | 𐧉 | 𐧊 | 𐧋 | 𐧌 | 𐧍 | 𐧎 | 𐧏 |
| U+109Dx | | | 𐧒 | 𐧓 | 𐧔 | 𐧕 | 𐧖 | 𐧗 | 𐧘 | 𐧙 | 𐧚 | 𐧛 | 𐧜 | 𐧝 | 𐧞 | 𐧟 |
| U+109Ex | 𐧠 | 𐧡 | 𐧢 | 𐧣 | 𐧤 | 𐧥 | 𐧦 | 𐧧 | 𐧨 | 𐧩 | 𐧪 | 𐧫 | 𐧬 | 𐧭 | 𐧮 | 𐧯 |
| U+109Fx | 𐧰 | 𐧱 | 𐧲 | 𐧳 | 𐧴 | 𐧵 | 𐧶 | 𐧷 | 𐧸 | 𐧹 | 𐧺 | 𐧻 | 𐧼 | 𐧽 | 𐧾 | 𐧿 |
Notes: 1. As of Unicode version 16.0; 2. Grey areas indicate non-assigned code points

== History ==
The following Unicode-related documents record the purpose and process of defining specific characters in the Meroitic Cursive block:

| Version | Final code points (Note: Proposed code points and characters names may differ from final code points and names) | Count | L2 ID | WG2 ID | Document |
|---|---|---|---|---|---|
| 6.1 | U+109A0..109B7, 109BE..109BF | 26 | L2/97-268 | N1638 | Everson, Michael (1997-09-18), Proposal to encode Meroitic in Plane 1 of ISO/IEC 10646-2 |
| 6.1 | U+109A0..109B7, 109BE..109BF | 26 | L2/98-070 | | Aliprand, Joan; Winkler, Arnold, "3.A.4.b", Minutes of the joint UTC and L2 meeting from the meeting in Cupertino, February 25-27, 1998 |
| 6.1 | U+109A0..109B7, 109BE..109BF | 26 | L2/98-286 | N1703 | Umamaheswaran, V. S.; Ksar, Mike (1998-07-02), Unconfirmed Meeting Minutes, WG 2 Meeting #34, Redmond, WA, USA; 1998-03-16--20 |
| 6.1 | U+109A0..109B7, 109BE..109BF | 26 | L2/99-222 | N2098 | Wolf, Pawel (1999-07-13), Report on the standardization of a Meroitic sign list for Unicode |
| 6.1 | U+109A0..109B7, 109BE..109BF | 26 | | N2134 | Everson, Michael (1999-10-02), Response to comments on the question of encoding Meroitic in the UCS (N2098) |
| 6.1 | U+109A0..109B7, 109BE..109BF | 26 | L2/08-269 | N3484 | Everson, Michael (2008-08-04), Preliminary proposal for encoding the Meroitic script in the SMP of the UCS |
| 6.1 | U+109A0..109B7, 109BE..109BF | 26 | L2/09-188R2 | N3646R2 | Everson, Michael (2009-05-13), Proposal for encoding the Meroitic script in the SMP of the UCS |
| 6.1 | U+109A0..109B7, 109BE..109BF | 26 | L2/09-250 | N3665 | Everson, Michael (2009-07-29), Proposal for encoding the Meroitic Hieroglyphic and the Meroitic Cursive scripts in the SMP of the UCS |
| 6.1 | U+109A0..109B7, 109BE..109BF | 26 | L2/09-225R | | Moore, Lisa (2009-08-17), "C.6", UTC #120 / L2 #217 Minutes |
| 6.1 | U+109A0..109B7, 109BE..109BF | 26 | | N3703 (pdf, doc) | Umamaheswaran, V. S. (2010-04-13), "M55.25", Unconfirmed minutes of WG 2 meeting no. 55, Tokyo 2009-10-26/30 |
| 8.0 | U+109BC..109BD, 109C0..109CF, 109D2..109FF (Note: See also L2/08-269, L2/09-188R2, and L2/09-250) | 64 | L2/11-237 | N4098 | Suignard, Michel (2011-06-06), Disposition of comments on SC2 N 4168 (ISO/IEC FCD 10646 3rd Ed., Information Technology – Universal Coded Character Set (UCS)) |
| 8.0 | U+109BC..109BD, 109C0..109CF, 109D2..109FF | 64 | | N4103 | "T3. Row 109A: Meroitic Cursive", Unconfirmed minutes of WG 2 meeting 58, 2012-01-03 |
| 8.0 | U+109BC..109BD, 109C0..109CF, 109D2..109FF | 64 | L2/12-206 | N4276 | Everson, Michael (2012-06-06), Proposal for encoding Meroitic numbers in the SMP of the UCS |
| 8.0 | U+109BC..109BD, 109C0..109CF, 109D2..109FF | 64 | L2/12-343R2 | | Moore, Lisa (2012-12-04), "C.19", UTC #133 Minutes |
| 8.0 | U+109BC..109BD, 109C0..109CF, 109D2..109FF | 64 | | N4353 (pdf, doc) | "M60.16", Unconfirmed minutes of WG 2 meeting 60, 2013-05-23 |
