= The Baptism of the Eunuch =

Painting by Rembrandt

- De doop van de kamerling (Dutch)
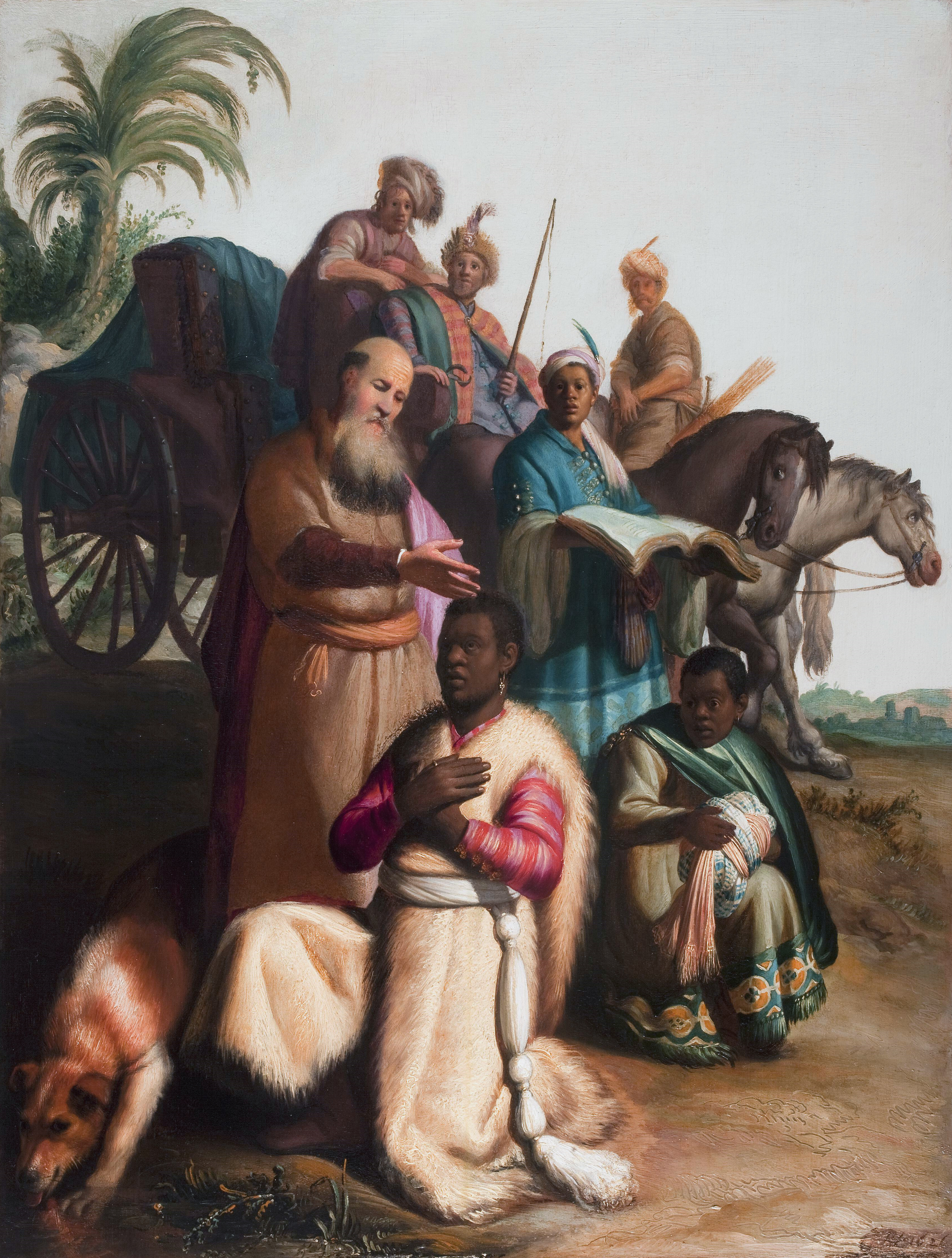
- Artist: Rembrandt
- Year: 1626
- Medium: Oil on panel
- Dimensions: 64 cm × 47.5 cm (25 in × 18.7 in)
- Location: Museum Catharijneconvent; Utrecht

The Baptism of the Eunuch is a 1626 painting by the Dutch artist Rembrandt van Rijn, owned by the Museum Catharijneconvent in Utrecht since 1976. It shows Philip the Evangelist baptising an Ethiopian man, a eunuch, on the road from Jerusalem to Gaza, traditionally marking the start of the Ethiopian Church (Acts 8:26–39).

== Description ==
In the middle of the foreground, a black man kneels as the foremost of seven figures staggered one behind the other, wearing an ermine cloak over a purple robe and a white waistband over it. His hair is black, short and curly, he seems to wear only a thin goatee and whiskers. He wears a gold pendant on his left ear and a gold ring on his right thumb. His left knee is on the ground and his right leg is bent, with his foot on the ground. The man faces the left foreground with his hands crossed in front of his chest, so that his head is in the center of the picture and his upper right arm follows the picture diagonal to the bottom left.

To the left of the center of the picture stands a tall white man with a sparse fringe of hair and a long gray beard, who is dressed in a light brown robe and wears an orange waistband and a purple cloak. He looks down at the black man's head and makes a blessing gesture with his right hand, which must be seen in the context as a baptismal gesture.

A black woman squats behind the baptismal candidate, who looks much younger and also has short black hair. She wears a grey-green robe with an elaborate green and yellow pattern on the hem and a green cape. Her robe is fastened with a golden fibula on the right shoulder and she wears a large ring on her left ear. She attentively observes the baptism, and on her knees she holds her master's turban of blue and red fabric.

To the right of center, but slightly offset from the background from the Baptist, stands a brown-skinned Oriental with a long blue robe and a turban-like white and purple headdress with a white feather. He holds a large open book in front of his stomach and looks at the viewer. Behind him, aligned to the right edge of the picture, is an open carriage with two horses and a white man dressed in oriental clothes, with a whip on the carriage and another servant behind him. Again, behind the two horses of the carriage is a white rider, also dressed in oriental clothing, who is facing left and, like the two carriage drivers, is looking at the viewer. He wears a quiver with arrows on his saddle, only the tail of his horse can be seen.

The background on the left is occupied by a palm tree that reaches up to the upper edge of the picture. On the right edge of the picture, the view extends far into the distance, with towering dark rocks or the silhouette of a town in front of two hills. In the left foreground is a large brown and white dog coming out from behind the Baptist and drinking at the water of the river in the lower left corner of the picture. To the right of it, but still in the left foreground, some herbs are shown. The foreground on the right is free; here the painter has scratched an irregular structure into the paint with the wooden shaft of his brush. In the lower right corner there is a monogram and the date RH 1626. The signature corresponds to other signatures by Rembrandt from 1626.

== See also ==
- List of paintings by Rembrandt
