= Meroitic Hieroglyphs (Unicode block) =

- Range: U+10980..U+1099F (32 code points)
- Plane: SMP
- Scripts: Meroitic Hieroglyphs
- Major alphabets: Meroitic
- Assigned: 32 code points
- Unused: 0 reserved code points

Unicode version history
- 6.1 (2012): 32 (+32)

Unicode documentation
- Code chart ∣ Web page

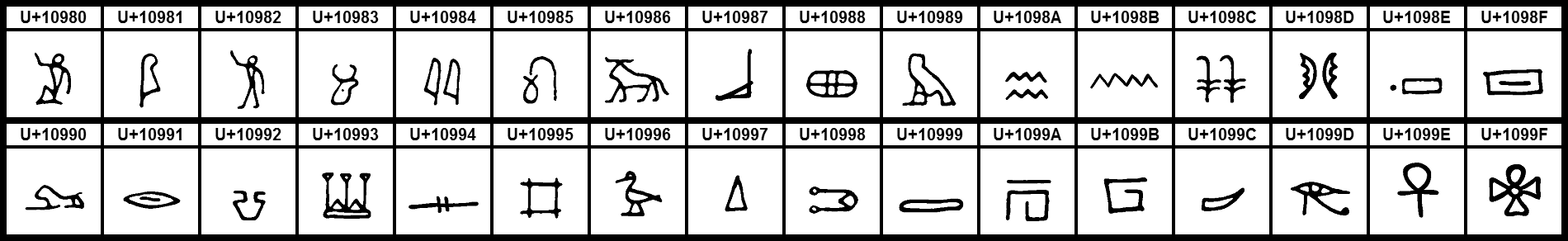
Graphical representation of the Meroitic Hieroglyphs Unicode block

Meroitic Hieroglyphs is a Unicode block formal hieroglyphic containing characters for writing the Meroitic language.

Meroitic Hieroglyphs^{[1]} Official Unicode Consortium code chart (PDF)
	0	1	2	3	4	5	6	7	8	9	A	B	C	D	E	F
U+1098x	𐦀	𐦁	𐦂	𐦃	𐦄	𐦅	𐦆	𐦇	𐦈	𐦉	𐦊	𐦋	𐦌	𐦍	𐦎	𐦏
U+1099x	𐦐	𐦑	𐦒	𐦓	𐦔	𐦕	𐦖	𐦗	𐦘	𐦙	𐦚	𐦛	𐦜	𐦝	𐦞	𐦟
Notes: 1. As of Unicode version 16.0

== History ==
The following Unicode-related documents record the purpose and process of defining specific characters in the Meroitic Hieroglyphs block:

Version	Final code points (Note: Proposed code points and characters names may differ from final code points and names)	Count	L2 ID	WG2 ID	Document
6.1	U+10980..1099F	32	L2/97-268	N1638	Everson, Michael (1997-09-18), Proposal to encode Meroitic in Plane 1 of ISO/IEC 10646-2
6.1	U+10980..1099F	32	L2/98-070		Aliprand, Joan; Winkler, Arnold, "3.A.4. item b. Meroitic", Minutes of the joint UTC and L2 meeting from the meeting in Cupertino, February 25-27, 1998
6.1	U+10980..1099F	32	L2/98-286	N1703	Umamaheswaran, V. S.; Ksar, Mike (1998-07-02), Unconfirmed Meeting Minutes, WG 2 Meeting #34, Redmond, WA, USA; 1998-03-16--20
6.1	U+10980..1099F	32	L2/99-222	N2098	Wolf, Pawel (1999-07-13), Report on the standardization of a Meroitic sign list for Unicode
6.1	U+10980..1099F	32		N2134	Everson, Michael (1999-10-02), Response to comments on the question of encoding Meroitic in the UCS (N2098)
6.1	U+10980..1099F	32	L2/08-269	N3484	Everson, Michael (2008-08-04), Preliminary proposal for encoding the Meroitic script in the SMP of the UCS
6.1	U+10980..1099F	32	L2/09-188R2	N3646R2	Everson, Michael (2009-05-13), Proposal for encoding the Meroitic script in the SMP of the UCS
6.1	U+10980..1099F	32	L2/09-104		Moore, Lisa (2009-05-20), "B.15.19", UTC #119 / L2 #216 Minutes
6.1	U+10980..1099F	32	L2/09-250	N3665	Everson, Michael (2009-07-29), Proposal for encoding the Meroitic Hieroglyphic and the Meroitic Cursive scripts in the SMP of the UCS
6.1	U+10980..1099F	32	L2/09-225R		Moore, Lisa (2009-08-17), "C.6", UTC #120 / L2 #217 Minutes
6.1	U+10980..1099F	32		N3703 (pdf, doc)	Umamaheswaran, V. S. (2010-04-13), "M55.25", Unconfirmed minutes of WG 2 meeting no. 55, Tokyo 2009-10-26/30
