= Pontifical (disambiguation) =

The Pontifical is a liturgical book used by a bishop. It may also refer specifically to the Roman Rite Roman Pontifical.

When used as an adjective, Pontifical may be used to describe things related to the office of a Bishop in the Catholic Church (see also Pontiff#Catholicism), such as the following:

- Pontifical High Mass
- Pontifical vestments
- Pontifical gloves
- Pontifical sandals

== See also ==
- Episcopal
- Papal regalia and insignia, items of attire and decoration proper to the Pope
