= Episcopal =

Episcopal may refer to:

- Of or relating to a bishop, an overseer in the Christian church
- Episcopal Church (disambiguation), any church with "Episcopal" in its name
  - Episcopal Church (United States), an affiliate of Anglicanism based in the United States
- Episcopal conference, an official assembly of bishops in a territory of the Catholic Church
- Episcopal polity, the church united under the oversight of bishops
- Episcopal see, the official seat of a bishop, often applied to the area over which he exercises authority
- Episcopate, the jurisdiction of a bishop – a diocese
- Historical episcopate, dioceses established according to apostolic succession

== See also ==
- Episcopal High School (disambiguation)
- Pontifical (disambiguation)
