= Seven Deacons =

New Testament leaders of Christians in Jerusalem

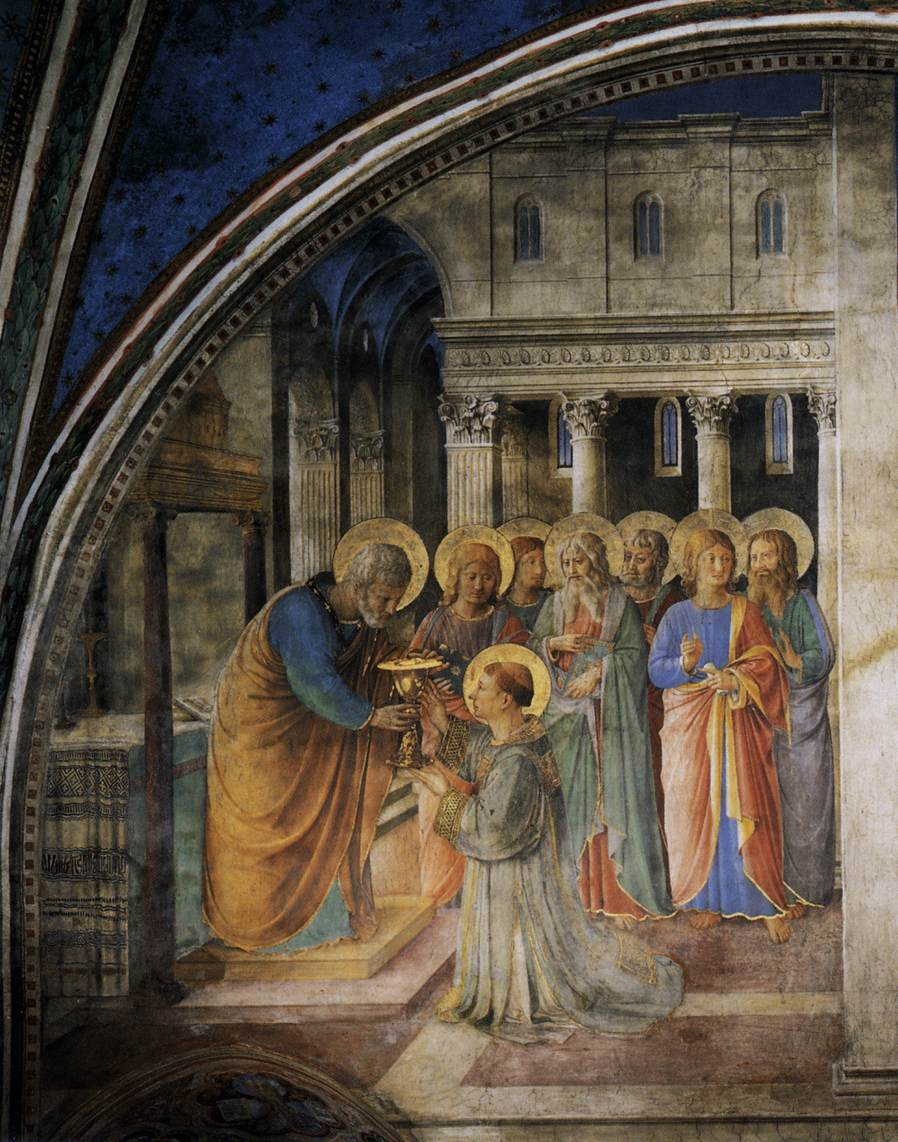
Section of a fresco in the Niccoline Chapel by Fra Angelico, depicting Saint Peter consecrating the Seven Deacons. Saint Stephen is shown kneeling.

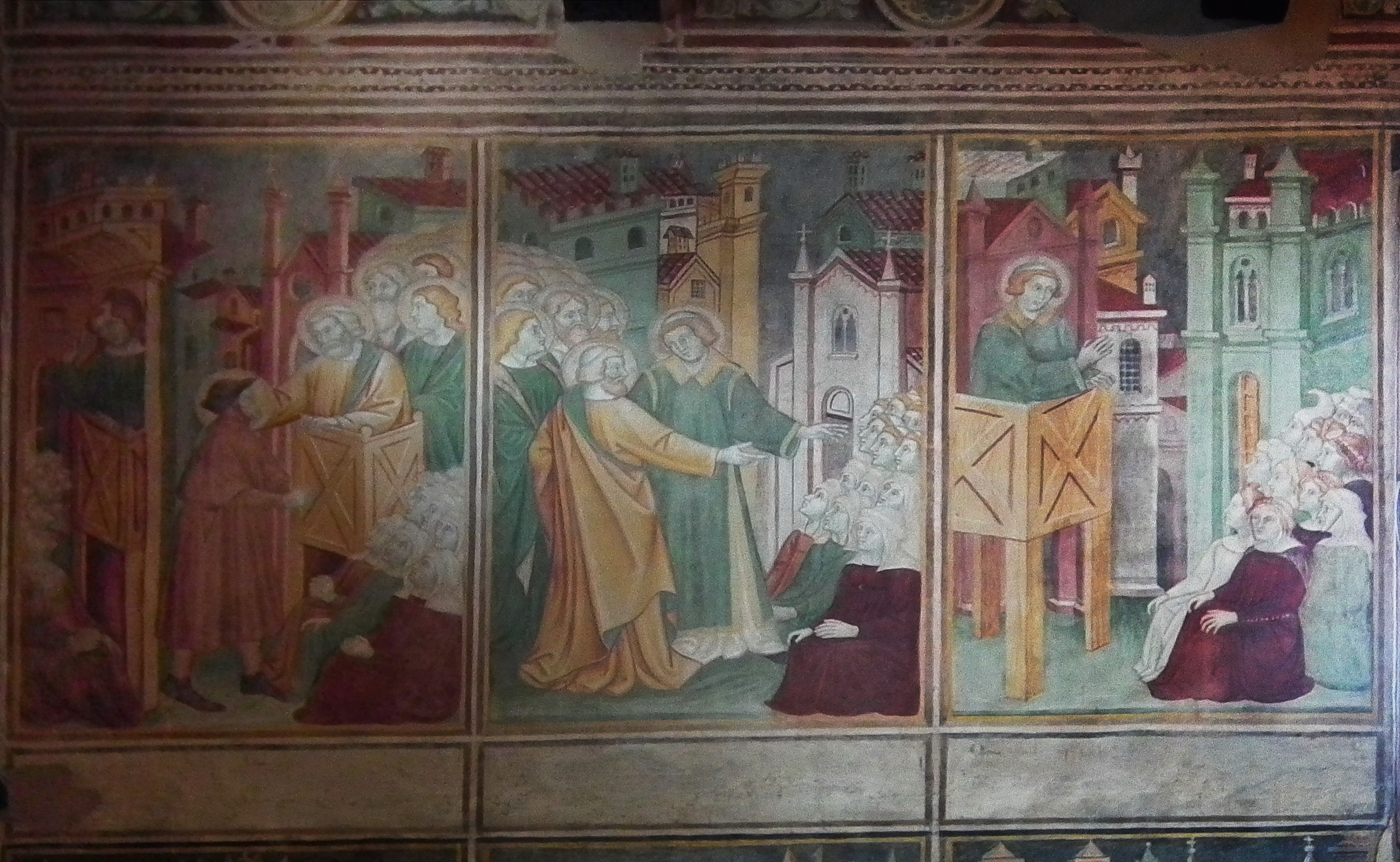
The seven deacons are commissioned to care for the widows. Fresco from the Oratory of Santo Stefano, Lentate sul Seveso.

The Seven, often known as the Seven Deacons, were leaders elected by the early Christian church to minister to the community of believers in Jerusalem, to enable the Apostles to concentrate on 'prayer and the Ministry of the Word' and to address a concern raised by Greek-speaking believers about their widows being overlooked in the daily diakonia or ministry.

== New Testament ==
Their names and an account of their appointment are given in chapter 6 of the Acts of the Apostles (Acts 6:1–6). According to a later tradition they are supposed to have also been among the Seventy Disciples who appear in the Gospel of Luke (Luke 10:1, 10:17). The activities of Stephen and Philip are the only two recorded and their works concern preaching, catechising and baptising. Philip is referred to as "the evangelist" in Acts 21:8.

Although the Seven are not called 'deacons' in the New Testament, their role is described as 'diaconal' (διακονεῖντραπέζαις in Greek), and they are therefore often regarded as the forerunners of the Christian order of deacons.

The Seven Deacons were:

- Stephen the Protomartyr
- Philip the Evangelist
- Prochorus
- Nicanor
- Timon
- Parmenas
- Nicholas

According to the narrative in Acts, they were identified and selected by the community of believers on the basis of their reputation and wisdom, being 'full of the Holy Spirit', and their appointment was confirmed by the Apostles.

== Details ==
Only Stephen and Philip are discussed in much detail in Acts; tradition provides nothing further about Nicanor or Parmenas. Stephen became the first martyr of the church when he was killed by a mob, and whose death was agreed to by Saul of Tarsus, the future Apostle Paul (Acts 8:1). Philip evangelized in Samaria, where he converted Simon Magus and an Ethiopian eunuch, traditionally beginning the Ethiopian Orthodox Church.

Tradition calls Prochorus the nephew of Stephen and a companion of John the Evangelist, who consecrated him bishop of Nicomedia in Bithynia (modern-day Turkey). He was traditionally ascribed the authorship of the apocryphal Acts of John, and was said to have ended his life as a martyr in Antioch in the 1st century.

According to Caesar Baronius' Annales Ecclesiastici, now considered historically inaccurate, Nicanor was a Cypriot Jew who returned to his native island and died a martyr in 76. Other accounts say he was martyred in "Berj", an unidentified place possibly confused with Botrys.

Timon was said to have been a Hellenized Jew who became a bishop in Greece or in Bosra, Syria; in the latter account, his preaching brought the ire of the local governor, who martyred him with fire.

After preaching for years in Asia Minor, where Hippolytus of Rome claimed he was bishop of Soli (Pompeiopolis; though he may have been referring to Soli, Cyprus), Parmenas was said to have settled down in Macedonia, where he died at Philippi in 98 during Trajan's persecutions. Alternatively, Orthodox tradition says he died after being afflicted with an illness.

Nicholas, who came from Antioch, was described in Acts as a convert to Judaism. He was not remembered fondly by some early writers. According to Irenaeus' Adversus Haereses, the Nicolaitanes, a heretical sect condemned as early as the Book of Revelation (c. AD 95), took their name from the deacon. In Philosophumena, Hippolytus writes he inspired the sect through his indifference to life and the pleasures of the flesh; his followers took this as a licence to give in to lust. The Catholic Encyclopedia records a story that after the Apostles reproached Nicholas for mistreating his beautiful wife on account of his jealousy, he left her and consented to anyone else marrying her, saying the flesh should be maltreated. In the Stromata, Clement of Alexandria says the sect corrupted Nicholas' words, originally designed to check the pleasures of the body, to justify licentiousness. The Catholic Encyclopedia notes that the historicity of the story is debatable, though the Nicolaitanes themselves may have considered Nicholas their founder.
