= Maloqorebar =

Kushite prince

Maloqorebar (late 3rd or early 4th century AD) was an ancient Kushite prince.

He is known from a single inscription, no. REM 0101, found in the so-called "Meroitic chamber" of the temple of Isis at Philae, which was originally read as tdxe Mloqorebr qoret Lhidmni. A recently discovered contemporary inscription, however, allows this reading to be corrected to tdxe Mloqorebr qore Tlhidmni. The word tdxe means 'child' and usually connected a child's name to a mother's. Qore(t) indicates a ruler. The original reading was variously translated:

- "the mother of Maloqorebar the king, Lakhidamani" (Griffith)
- "Lakhidamani, the mother's child of the ruler Maloqorebar" (Macadam, Haycock)
- "Maloqorebar, child of a queen Lakhideamani"
- "a present that Maloqorebar, the king's man, and Lakhidamani" (Priese, reinterpreting tdxe)

The revised reading is translated "the child Maloqorebar and the ruler Talakhidamani". It is based on the appearance of the king Talakhidamani in another inscription. The name Maloqorebar probably means "beautiful is the boy of the kings". The inscription is associated with a diplomatic mission sent by Talakhidamani to meet with Roman authorities. It is possible that he was ruling Kush as regent on behalf of the young Maloqorebar. Since royal names at the time typically had the -amani element (after Amun), Maloqorebar does not appear to have been a ruler. In the inscription, the two are placed under the protection of the goddess Patarus (an epithet of Isis) and the child god Horus.

The absence of Maloqorebar's name on the other inscription of Talakhidamani suggests that he died before it was carved.
