= Episcopal Church =

The Episcopal Church is any of various churches in the Anglican and Methodist traditions.

An episcopal church has bishops in its organisational structure (see episcopal polity). Episcopalian is a synonym for Anglican in Scotland, the United States and several other locations.

== Anglicanism ==
=== Anglican Communion ===
- Episcopal Church (United States) in the United States, Honduras, Taiwan, Colombia, Ecuador, Haiti, the Dominican Republic, Venezuela, the British Virgin Islands and parts of Europe
- Scottish Episcopal Church
- Igreja Episcopal Anglicana do Brasil (Brazil)
- Iglesia Episcopal de Cuba
- Episcopal Church in Jerusalem and the Middle East
- Episcopal Church in the Philippines
- Spanish Reformed Episcopal Church
- Episcopal Church of the Sudan
- Episcopal Church of Taiwan

=== Continuing Anglican Movement ===
- Anglican Episcopal Church, U.S.
- Episcopal Missionary Church, U.S.
- Traditional Protestant Episcopal Church, U.S.
- Southern Episcopal Church, U.S.
- United Episcopal Church of North America, U.S.

Independent Anglican

- Free Protestant Episcopal Church, North America
- Reformed Episcopal Church, North and South America, Asia, Europe. Now closely associated with some of the Continuing Anglican churches.
- Open Episcopal Church, a liberal denomination

== Methodism ==
=== Methodist ===
- African Methodist Episcopal Church, U.S.
- African Methodist Episcopal Zion Church, North America
- Christian Methodist Episcopal Church, North America
- the former Methodist Episcopal Church, now part of the United Methodist Church

== Lutheranism ==
- Batak Christian Protestant Church
- Church of Denmark
- Church of Finland
- Church of Iceland
- Church of Norway
- Church of Sweden

=== Convergence Movement ===
- Charismatic Episcopal Church
- Communion of Evangelical Episcopal Churches

== See also ==
- Episcopal (disambiguation)
