= Philip the Evangelist =

1st-century Christian saint

Saint Philip the Evangelist
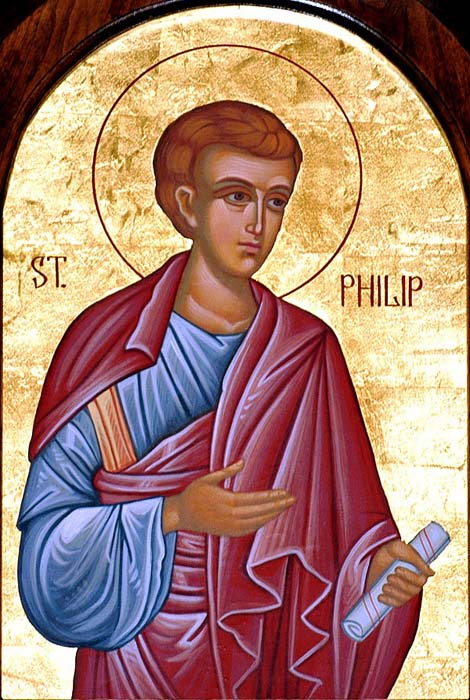

Evangelist or Deacon Apostle of the Seventy One of the Seven Deacons
- Born: Unknown (c. 1st century AD); Caesarea Maritima, Judaea Roman Empire
- Died: 11 October (c. 1st century AD); Hierapolis, Asia, Roman Empire
- Venerated in: Catholic Church (Latin and Eastern Rites); Eastern Orthodox Church; Oriental Orthodox Churches; Protestantism
- Feast: 11 October

Philip the Evangelist (Greek: Φίλιππος, Philippos) appears several times in the Acts of the Apostles. According to the work, he was one of the Seven chosen to care for the poor of the Christian community in Jerusalem (Acts 6). He preached and performed miracles in Samaria, and met and baptised an Ethiopian man, a eunuch, on the road from Jerusalem to Gaza, traditionally marking the start of the Ethiopian Church (Acts 8:26–39). Later, Philip lived in Caesarea Maritima with his four daughters who prophesied, where he was visited by Paul the Apostle (Acts 21:8–9).

== New Testament ==
Philip bore a Greek name. He is first mentioned in the Acts of the Apostles (6:5) as one of "Seven Deacons" who were chosen to attend to certain temporal affairs of the church in Jerusalem in consequence of the murmurings of the Hellenists against the Hebrews.

After the martyrdom of Stephen he went to "the city of Samaria", where he preached with much success, Simon Magus being one of his converts. He afterwards was told by an angel of the Lord to go to the road between Jerusalem and Gaza. There he instructed and baptized the Ethiopian eunuch; next he was "caught away" by the Spirit and "found at Azotus" (Ashdod); and then "passing through he preached in all the cities till he came to Caesarea" (Acts 8). Philip made Caesarea Maritima his home.

Here some years afterwards, according to Acts 21:8–9, where he is described as "the evangelist" (a term found again in the New Testament only in Ephesians 4:11 and 2 Timothy 4:5), he entertained Paul the Apostle and his companions on their way to Jerusalem; at that time "he had four daughters, virgins, which did prophesy".

== Tradition ==
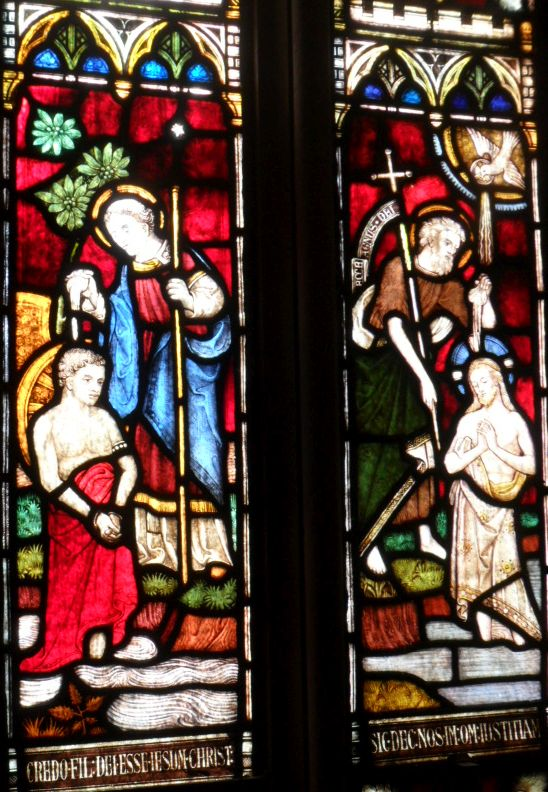
A stained glass diptych showing the baptisms of the Ethiopian eunuch by St. Philip the Evangelist and of Jesus Christ by St. John the Baptist, from the Cathedral of the Incarnation (Garden City, New York).

According to Eusebius, the Apostolic Father Papias of Hierapolis met the daughters of Philip and received information from them. Christopher Matthews finds no strong reasons to dispute Papias' contact with the Evangelist's daughters. At a very early period he came to be confused with the Philip the Apostle; the confusion was all the more easy because, as an esteemed member of the apostolic company, he may readily have been described as an apostle in the wider sense of that word, beyond the original Twelve Apostles. A late tradition describes him as settling at Tralles in Anatolia, where he became the bishop of that church.

== Feasts ==
"St Philip the Deacon" is commemorated on October 11 in the Eastern Orthodox Church, in the Roman Rite, the Lutheran Church – Missouri Synod, and in the Anglican communion including, for example, the U.S. Episcopal Church, and the Anglican Church of Southern Africa. Additionally, in the Eastern Orthodox Church, Philip is counted among the Seventy Apostles, and is referred to as a Protodeacon; this feast day is celebrated on January 4.
