= Meroitic language =

Extinct language

Meroitic
- Kushite
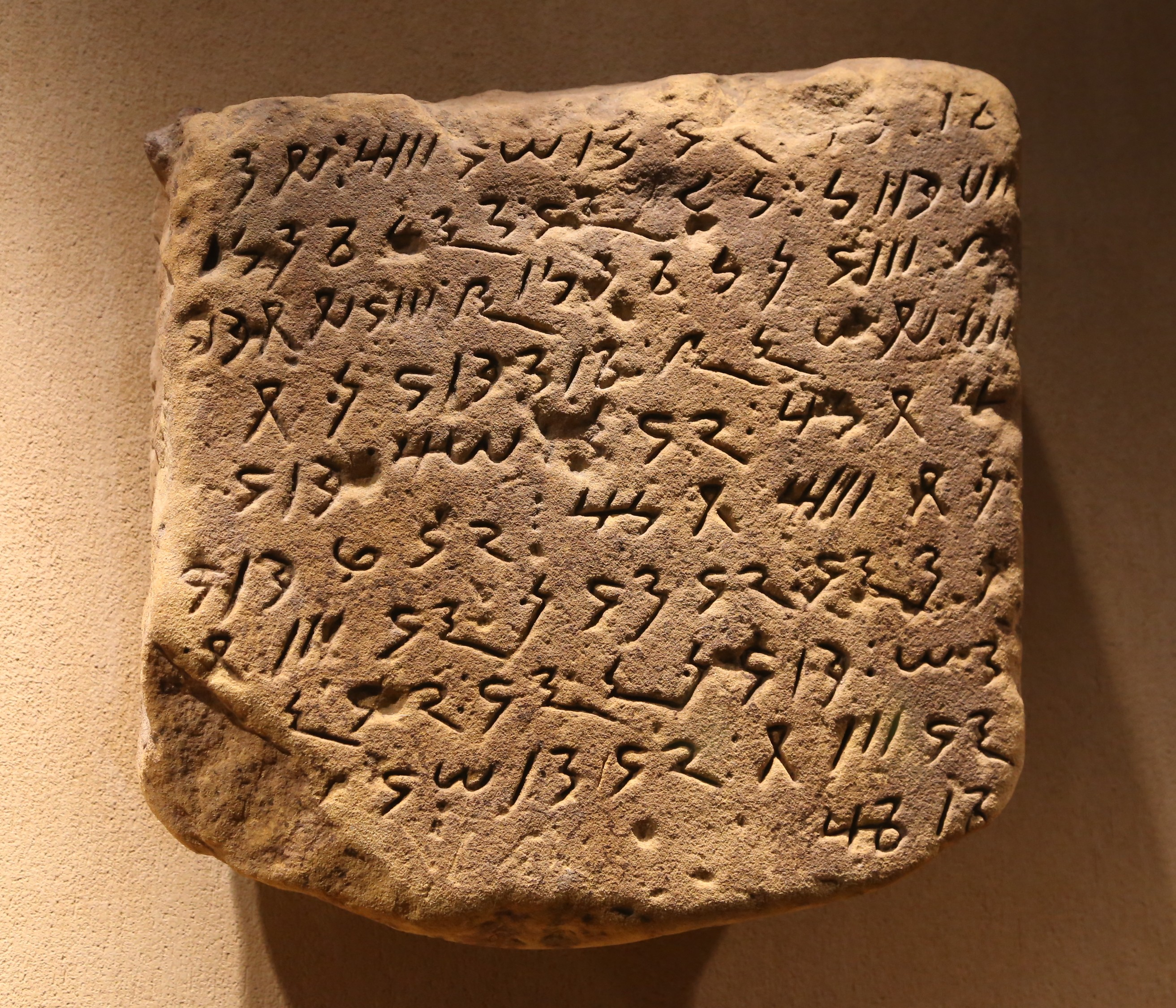
- Meroitic inscription (1st century BC), Egyptian Museum of Berlin
- Native to: Kingdom of Kush
- Region: Southern part of Upper Egypt around Aswan (Lower Nubia) to the Khartoum area of Sudan (Upper Nubia)
- Extinct: by 4th century AD
- Language family: Unclassified (possibly Nilo-Saharan or Afroasiatic)
- Writing system: Meroitic alphabet

Language codes
- ISO 639-3: xmr
- Glottolog: mero1237

The Meroitic language (/mɛroʊˈɪtɪk/) is an extinct language of uncertain linguistic affiliation formerly spoken in Meroë (in present-day Sudan) during the Meroitic period (attested from 300 BC) and became extinct about 400 AD. It was written in two forms of the Meroitic alphabet: Meroitic Cursive, which was written with a stylus and was used for general record-keeping; and Meroitic Hieroglyphic, which was carved in stone or used for royal or religious documents. It is poorly understood, owing to the scarcity of bilingual texts.

== Name ==
Meroitic is also referred to in some publications as Kushite after the apparent attested endoethnonym Meroitic qes, qos (transcribed in Egyptian as kꜣš). The name Meroitic in English dates to 1852 where it occurs as a translation of German Meroitisch. The term derives from Latin Meroē, corresponding to Greek Μερόη. These latter names are representations of the name of the royal city of Meroë of the Kingdom of Kush. In Meroitic, this city is referred to as bedewe (or sometimes bedewi), which is represented in ancient Egyptian texts as bꜣ-rꜣ-wꜣ or similar variants.

== Classification ==
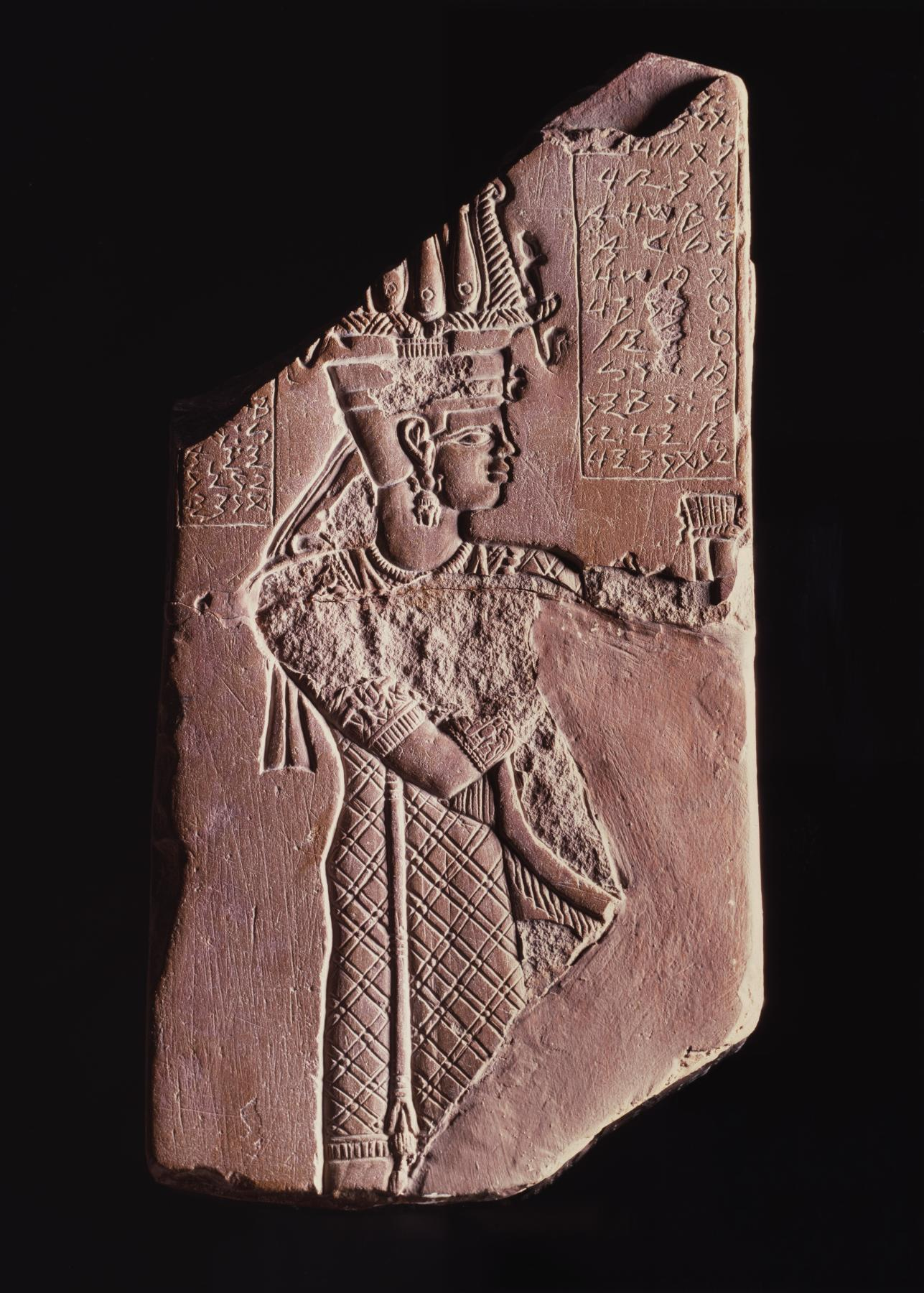
A hieroglyphic Meroitic inscription adorns this royal votive plaque of king Tanyidamani. It is from the temple of Apedemak in Meroë. Circa 100 BC, Walters Art Museum, Baltimore.

The classification of the Meroitic language is uncertain due to the scarcity of data and difficulty in interpreting it. Since the alphabet was deciphered in 1909, it has been proposed that Meroitic is related to the Nubian languages and similar languages of the Nilo-Saharan phylum. The competing claim is that Meroitic is a member of the Afroasiatic phylum.

Rowan (2006, 2011) proposes that the Meroitic sound inventory and phonotactics (the only aspects of the language that are secure) are similar to those of the Afroasiatic languages, and dissimilar from Nilo-Saharan languages. For example, she notes that very rarely does one find the sequence CVC, where the consonants (C) are both labials or both velars, noting that is similar to consonant restrictions found throughout the Afroasiatic language family, suggesting that Meroitic might have been an Afroasiatic language like Egyptian. Semitist Edward Lipiński (2011) also argues in favour of an Afroasiatic origin for Meroitic, based primarily on vocabulary.

Claude Rilly (2004, 2007, 2012, 2016) is the most recent proponent of the Nilo-Saharan idea: he proposes, based on its syntax, morphology, and known vocabulary, that Meroitic is Eastern Sudanic, the Nilo-Saharan family that includes the Nubian languages. He finds, for example, that word order in Meroitic "conforms perfectly with other Eastern Sudanic languages, in which sentences exhibit verb-final order (SOV: subject-object-verb); there are postpositions and no prepositions; the genitive is placed before the main noun; the adjective follows the noun."

== Location and period of attestation ==
The Meroitic period began ca. 300 BC and ended ca. 350 AD. Most attestations of the Meroitic language, via native inscriptions, hail from this period, though some attestations pre- and post-date this period. The Kushite territory stretched from the area of the First Cataract of the Nile to the Khartoum area of Sudan. It can be assumed that speakers of Meroitic covered much of that territory, based on the language contact evidenced in Egyptian texts. Attestations of Meroitic in Egyptian texts, span across the Egyptian Middle Kingdom, the New Kingdom, and the late 3rd Intermediate, Late, Ptolemaic, and Roman periods – respectively corresponding to the Kushite Kerman (ca. 2600–ca. 1500 BC), Napatan (ca. 900/750–ca. 300 BC), and Meroitic periods. The Meroitic toponym ⟨qes⟩, ⟨qos⟩, as well as Meroitic anthroponyms, are attested as early as Middle Kingdom Egypt's 12th Dynasty (ca. 2000 BC) in the Egyptian execration texts concerning Kerma. Meroitic names and phrases appear in the New Kingdom Book of the Dead (Book of Coming Forth by Day) in the "Nubian" chapters or spells (162–165). Meroitic names and lexical items, in Egyptian texts, are most frequently attested during Napatan Kushite control of some or all parts of Egypt in the late 3rd Intermediate and Late Periods (ca. 750–656 BC). Both the Meroitic Period and the Kingdom of Kush itself ended with the fall of Meroë (ca. 350 AD), but use of the Meroitic language continued for a time after that event as there are detectable Meroitic lexemes and morphological features in Old Nubian. Two examples are: Meroitic: ⟨m(a)s(a)-l(a)⟩ "the sun" → Old Nubian: mašal "sun" and Old Nubian: -lo (focus particle) ← Meroitic: -⟨lo⟩, which consists of two morphemes, -⟨l(a)⟩ (determinant) and ⟨o⟩ (copula). The language likely became fully extinct by the 6th century when it was supplanted by Byzantine Greek, Coptic, and Old Nubian.

== Orthography ==
During the Meroitic period, Meroitic was written in two forms of the Meroitic alphasyllabary: Meroitic Cursive, which was written with a stylus and was used for general record-keeping; and Meroitic Hieroglyphic, which was carved in stone or used for royal or religious documents. The last known Meroitic inscription is written in Meroitic Cursive and dates to the 5th century.

== Vocabulary ==
Below is a short list of Kushite words and parts of speech whose meanings are positively known and are not known to be adopted from Egyptian. Angle brackets (⟨...⟩) represent the graphemes, or orthographic letters, used to write a word, as opposed to the word's phonemic representation. All non-syllabic, non-vocalic signs are written with their inherent ⟨a⟩ in parentheses. All ⟨e⟩ signs are written in parentheses (or brackets if in a word in parentheses) because of not knowing whether the ⟨e⟩ is a non-phonemic placeholder to preserve the syllabicity of the script or is actually vocalic. It is known that the final ⟨e⟩ in Kandake/ Kentake (female ruler) is vocalic and the initial vowel in ⟨yetmde⟩, ⟨edxe⟩, and ⟨erike⟩ is vocalic. Since those are known to be vocalic, they are not in parentheses. Any known ⟨n(a)⟩ signs resyllabified into coda position are written.

- ⟨(a)b(a)r(a)⟩ "man"
- ⟨at(a)⟩ "bread"
- ⟨ato⟩ (← *as[V]tu) "water"
- -⟨b(a)⟩- (plural)
- ⟨(e/t[e]-)d(a)x(e)⟩ "born, be born, child of"
- ⟨(t/y-)erik(e)⟩ "beget, begotten"
- ⟨k(a)(n)di⟩ "woman, lady, female".
- -⟨k(e)⟩ (ablative)
- -⟨l(a)⟩- (determinant)
- ⟨l(a)ẖ(a)⟩ "great, big"
- ⟨m(a)k(a)⟩ "god, deity"
- ⟨m(a)t(e)⟩, (later) ⟨m(a)s(e)⟩ "child, son"
- ⟨m(a)s(a)⟩ "sun, sun god"
- ⟨qor(e)⟩ "king, ruler"
- ⟨s(a)t(a)⟩ "feet, foot, pair of feet"
- -⟨s(e)⟩- (genitive)
- ⟨t(a)k(e)⟩ "to love, beloved, to respect, to revere, to desire"
- -⟨t(e)⟩ (locative)/ -⟨y(a)t(e)⟩ (a type of locative)
- -⟨x(a)⟩-, (later) -⟨x(e)⟩- (verbal pronominal suffix)
- ⟨yet(a)m(a)d(e)⟩ "a non-filial, non-(grand)parental, non-avuncular-maternal familial relation"

== Bibliography ==
- Bender, Marvin Lionel (1981). "The Meroitic problem". In Bender, M. L. (ed.). Peoples and cultures of the Ethio-Sudan borderlands. Committee on Northeast African Studies, African Studies Center, Michigan State University. pp. 5–32.
- Böhm, Gerhard (1988). Die Sprache der Aithiopen im Lande Kusch. Beiträge zur Afrikanistik (in German). Vol. 34. Wien. ISBN 3-85043-047-2.
- Breyer, Francis (2014). Einführung in die Meroitistik. Einführungen und Quellentexte zur Ägyptologie. Vol. 8. ISBN 978-3-643-12805-8.
- Lipiński, Edward (2011). "Meroitic (Review article)" (PDF). Rocznik Orientalistyczny. LXIV (2): 87–104. — review of Rilly, Claude (2010). Le méroïtique et sa famille linguistique. Société d’Études linguistiques et anthropologiques de France. Vol. 454. Peeters.
- Pope, Jeremy W. (2014). The Double Kingdom under Taharqo: Studies in the History of Kush and Egypt, c. 690–664 BC. Leiden: Brill. ISBN 978-90-04-26294-2.
- Rilly, Claude (March 2004). "The Linguistic Position of Meroitic" (PDF). Sudan Electronic Journal of Archaeology and Anthropology. Archived from the original (PDF) on 23 September 2015.
- Rilly, Claude (2007). La langue du Royaume de Meroe. Paris: Champion.
- Rilly, Claude (June 2016). "Meroitic". In Stauder-Porchet, Julie; Stauder, Andréas; Wendrich, Willeke (eds.). Meroitic. UCLA Encyclopedia of Egyptology. 1.
- Rilly, Claude; de Voogt, Alex (2012). The Meroitic Language and Writing System. Cambridge University Press. ISBN 978-1-10700-866-3.
- Rowan, Kirsty (2006). Meroitic: A Phonological Investigation (PDF) (PhD thesis). SOAS, University of London.
- Rowan, Kirsty (2006). "Meroitic – An Afroasiatic Language?" (PDF). SOAS Working Papers in Linguistics. 14: 169–206. Archived from the original (PDF) on 27 December 2015.
- Rowan, Kirsty (2011). "Meroitic Consonant and Vowel Patterning. Typological Indications for the Presence of Uvulars". Lingua Aegytia. 19. Hamburg: Widmaier.
- Rowan, Kirsty (2015). "The Meroitic Initial a Sign as Griffith's Initial Aleph" (PDF). Zeitschrift für Ägyptische Sprache und Altertumskunde. 142 (1): 70–84. doi:10.1515/zaes-2015-0007. S2CID 191460960.
- Welsby, Derek A. (1996). The Kingdom of Kush. London: British Museum Press. pp. 189–195. ISBN 071410986X.
