= Ergamenes =

Nubian king

Ergamenes is the hellenized name of a Nubian king of Meroë reported by Agatharchides in Diodorus Siculus (3.2.6, FHN II No. 142). According to this account, Ergamenes reigned in Meroë during the friendly Egyptian reign of Ptolemy II Philadelphus to Ptolemy IV Philopator, was instructed in Greek philosophy, favored Greek art and its way of life, although it could be rather intended as a cultural influence from a Ptolemaic-governed Egypt. He resented the tradition of ancient Egypt and the Ethiopian priests' control over the King's power and preferred the absolute power of his neighbor, Ptolemy II:

A death of the kings, is still more extra-ordinary. The priests at Meroë have acquired great power. When they form a resolution, they send a courier to the king, with an order to him to die. They tell him that the gods (or oracles) had thus decreed, and that he would be guilty of crime if he violated an order from them. They added many other reasons, which would easily influence a simple man, aware of ancient custom, and who has no strength of the mind sufficient to resist such an unjust command. The first kings submitted to this cruel sentence. Ergamenes, who reigned at the time of the second Ptolemy, and who was instructed in the philosophy of Greece, was the first who dared to throw off this ridiculous yoke. He went with his army to the place difficult to get to, or fortress, when was formally the temple of gold of the Ethiopians, and caused all the priests to be massacred, and instituted himself a new religion.

— Diodorus Siculus, Story of Ergamenes

== Identification ==
Ergamenes was tentatively identified with many archaeologically known king of Meroë, above all two kings with similar names, Arakamani and Arqamani. This situation has led to cause these two kings to be called Ergamenes I (Arakamani) and Ergamenes II (Arqamani). Although it is possible that – in a way similar to the semi-mythological Sesostris – Greeks conflated several rulers into a single figure named Ergamenes, Egyptologist Fritz Hintze and Meroitologist László Török believes that the original Ergamenes should be identified with Arakamani.
