= Arakamani =

King of Meroe

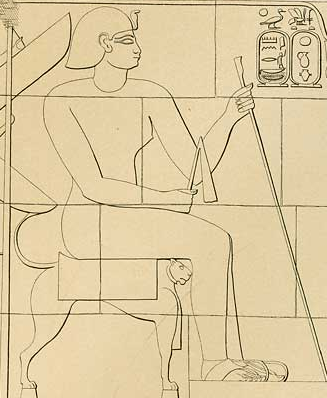
- Depiction of Arakamani, from Meroë pyramid Beg. S 6

Kushite king of Meroë
- Reign: around 270 BCE
- Predecessor: Sabrakamani
- Successor: Amanislo
Royal titulary
Prenomen
< ra W9 ib >
Khnemibre
Ḫnm-jb-Rˁ
Nomen
< i mn n A26 r k k >
Arkakamani
'rkk-Jmn
- Burial: Meroë, Beg. S 6

Arakamani (also Arkamaniqo, Arkakamani or Ergamenes I) was a Nubian king of Meroë, who ruled in the early third century BCE.

== Biography ==
The only secure archeological attestations of Arakamani come from his funerary pyramid at Meroë (Pyramid Begarawiyah S 6). In addition, many scholars believe that he should be identified with the Nubian king Ergamenes mentioned by the Classical historian Diodorus Siculus in his Bibliotheca historica. Diodorus writes that the powerful priesthood wanted the death of Ergamenes in order to please the gods, but because he was educated in Hellenistic culture, Ergamenes' strong will enabled him to negate this destiny and to overpower the priesthood.

The events reported in this account are now interpreted as a dynastic change in relation with the transfer of the royal necropolis – and thus of the capital city – from Napata to Meroë. Thus, many scholars regard Arakamani/Ergamenes as the first king of the Meroitic phase of Nubian history, when the power base of the kingdom finally moved to its southern reaches and when a distinct Nubian influence became stronger. It has been suggested that the "Greek culture", which Diodorus claimed was the origin of Ergamenes' strong-will, should be understood as the Greco-Egyptian culture of the Ptolemaic Kingdom (305 BC–30 BC), when Egypt was ruled by a Greek dynasty.

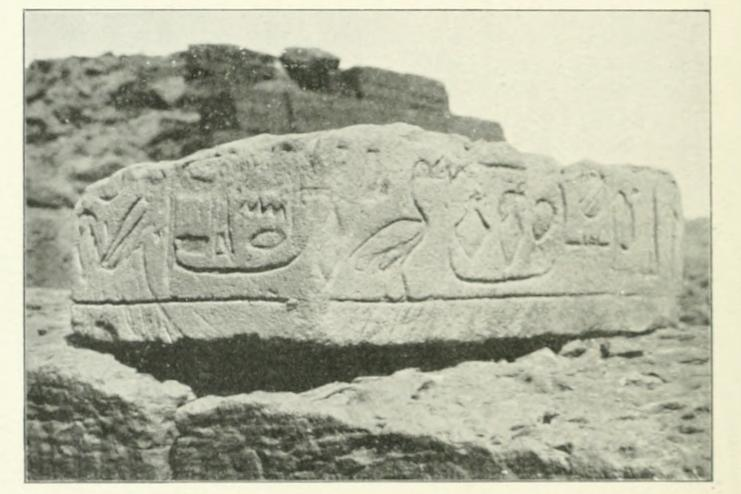
Arakamani cartouches on a stone fragment from East Meroë

If the identification of Arakamani with Ergamenes I is correct, Arakamani provides an important chronological marker for Nubian history as Diodorus writes that he was a contemporary of Ptolemy II Philadelphus (reign 285–246 BCE) in Ptolemaic Egypt. Most Nubian kings are otherwise very difficult to date precisely as well as to order chronologically.

Arakamani chose the throne name of Ahmose II of the Twenty-sixth Dynasty of Egypt, "The Heart of Ra Rejoices", for his titulary rather than from the kings of the New Kingdom of Egypt as previous Kushite kings had done. Ahmose II usurped the throne from his predecessor Apries and Arakamani's use of his titularly may have been an admission of taking the Kushite throne by force as well.

== Bibliography ==
- Török, László (2008). Between Two Worlds: The Frontier Region Between Ancient Nubia and Egypt 3700 BC - 500 AD. Brill. ISBN 978-90-04-17197-8.
