= Sabrakamani =

Kushite King of Meroë
- Reign: c. first half of the 3rd century BC
- Predecessor: Piankhi-Yerike-Qo
- Successor: Arakamani I
Royal titulary
Nomen
Son of Ra Sabrakamani (Sa-Re:Sbrk-Imn)

G39 N5	xa Aa13 n p mw pr Z1
- Born: c. 4th century BC
- Died: c. 2nd century BC

Sabrakamani was a Nubian king who is mentioned only in an inscription found so far. It is found in the Amun temple at Kawa. This badly damaged inscription also mentions king Piye-Iry-qo, who therefore preceded him. The inscription is on top of two inscriptions from Amanineteyerike, which is an indication that Sabrakamani reigned later than Amanineteyerike. The inscription lists dedications to the temple. Sabrakamani dates possibly in the first half of the 3rd century BC.

== Literature ==
- László Török, in: Fontes Historiae Nubiorum, Vol. II, Bergen 1996, S. 533–536, ISBN 8291626014
