= Meroë =

Ancient city along the eastern bank of the Nile River in Northern Sudan

- Meroe
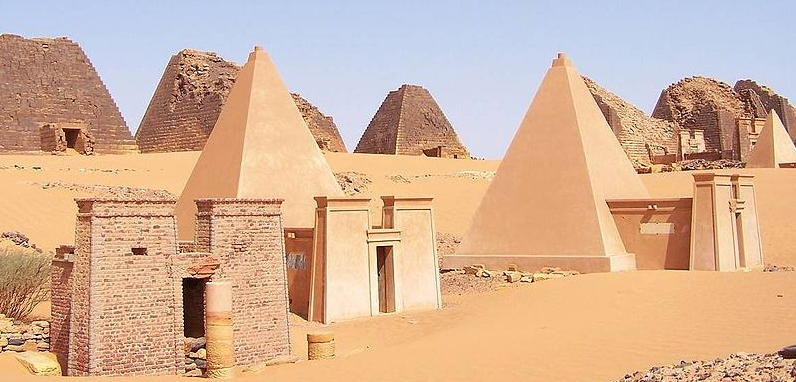
- Pyramids of the Kushite rulers at Meroë, covering a period from 300 BC to about 350 AD

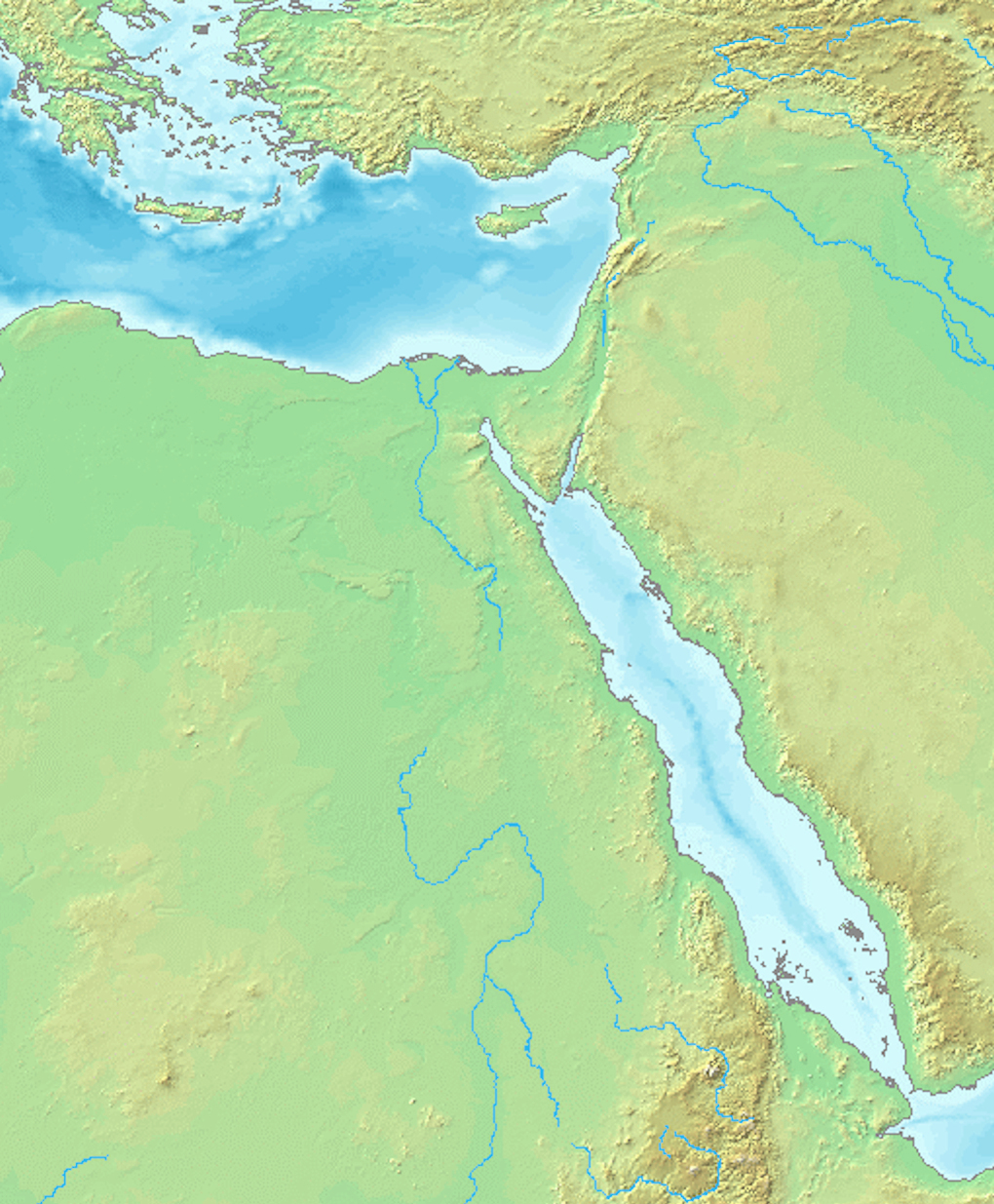
- Location within Northeast Africa Location within Sudan
- 16°56′00″N 33°43′35″E
- Type: Settlement
- Location: River Nile, Sudan
- Region: Kush

UNESCO World Heritage Site
- Official name: Archaeological Sites of the Island of Meroe
- Type: Cultural
- Criteria: ii, iii, vi, v
- Designated: 2011 (35th session)
- Reference no.: 1336
- Region: Africa

Meroë (Note: /ˈmɛroʊiː/; also spelled Meroe; Meroitic: 𐦨𐦡𐦷𐦡𐦥𐦢, romanized: Medewi; Arabic: مرواه, romanized: Meruwah and مروي, Meruwi; Ancient Greek: Μερόη, romanized: Meróē) was an ancient city on the east bank of the Nile about 6 km (3.7 mi) north-east of the Kabushiya station, which is 35 km (22 mi) north-east of Shendi, Sudan, about 200 km north-east of Khartoum. Near the site is a group of villages called Bagrawiyah (Arabic: البجراوية). This city was the capital of the Kingdom of Kush for several centuries from around 590 BC, until its collapse in the 4th century AD. The Kushitic Kingdom of Meroë gave its name to the "Island of Meroë", which was the modern region of Butana, a region bounded by the Nile (from the Atbarah River to Khartoum), the Atbarah and the Blue Nile.

The city of Meroë was on the edge of Butana. There were two other Meroitic cities in Butana: Musawwarat es-Sufra and Naqa. The first of these sites was given the name Meroë by the Persian king Cambyses, in honor of his sister who was called by that name. The city had originally borne the ancient appellation Saba, named after the country's original founder. The eponym Saba, or Seba, is named for one of the sons of Cush (see Genesis 10:7). The presence of numerous Meroitic sites within the western Butana region and on the border of Butana proper is significant to the settlement of the core of the developed region. The orientation of these settlements exhibit the exercise of state power over subsistence production.

The Kingdom of Kush which housed the city of Meroë represents one of a series of early states located within the middle Nile. It was one of the earliest and most advanced states found on the African continent. Looking at the specificity of the surrounding early states within the middle Nile, one's understanding of Meroë in combination with the historical developments of other historic states may be enhanced through looking at the development of power relation characteristics within other Nile Valley states.

The site of the city of Meroë is marked by more than two hundred pyramids in three groups, of which many are in ruins. They have the distinctive size and proportions of Nubian pyramids.

== History ==
mi rw i wA t niwt xAst
mjrwjwꜣt
in hieroglyphs
Era: Kingdom of Kush
(780 BC–350 AD)

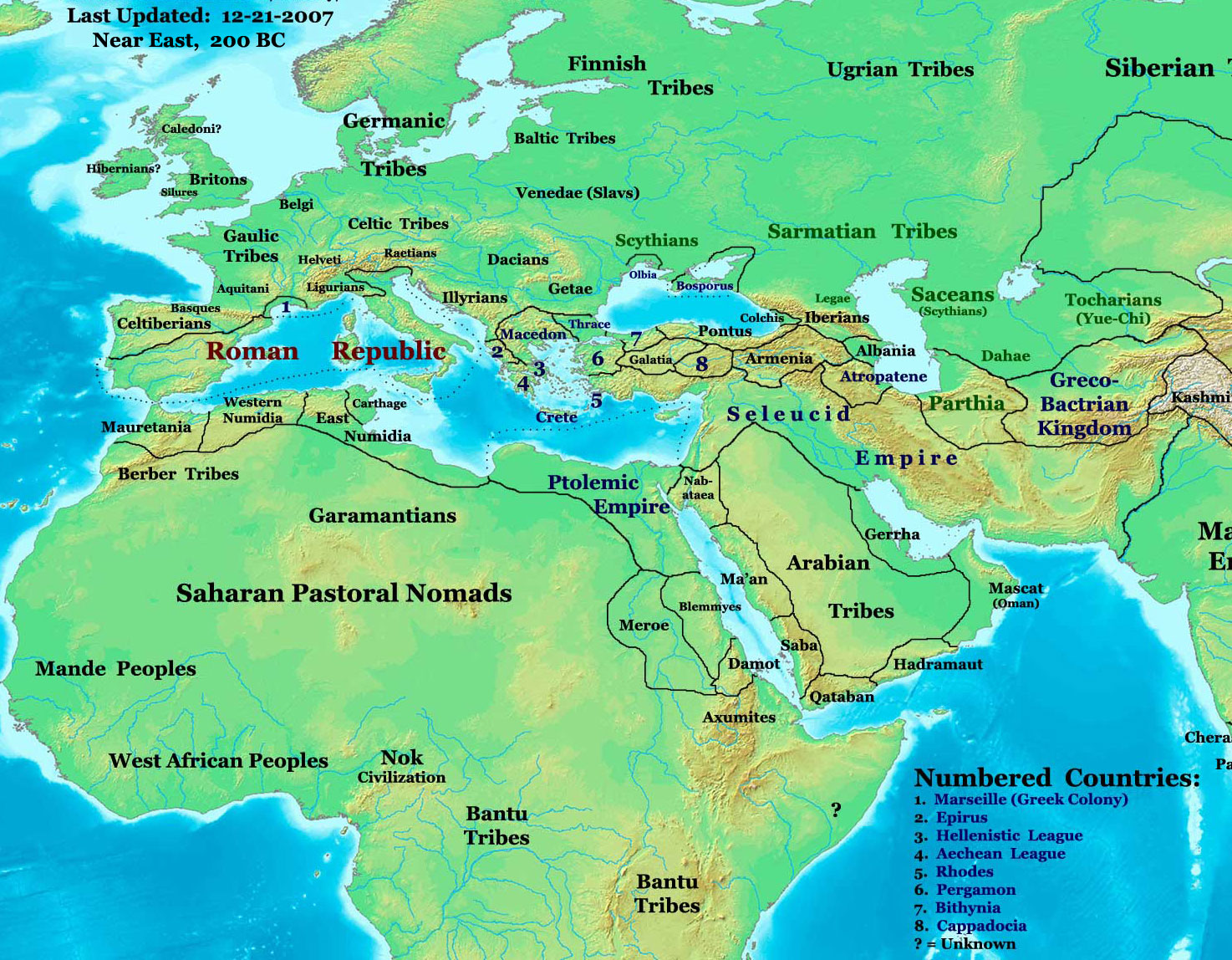
Near East in 200 BC, showing the Kingdom of Meroë and its neighbours.

Meroë was the southern capital of the Kingdom of Kush. The Kingdom of Kush spanned the period c. 800 BC – c. 350 AD. Initially, its main capital was farther north at Napata. King Aspelta moved the capital to Meroë, considerably farther south than Napata, possibly c. 591 BC, just after the sack of Napata by Egyptian Pharaoh Psamtik II.

Martin Meredith states the Kushite rulers chose Meroë, between the Fifth and Sixth Cataracts, because it was on the fringe of the summer rainfall belt, and the area was rich in iron ore and hardwood for iron working. The location also afforded access to trade routes to the Red Sea. The city of Meroë was located along the middle Nile which is of much importance due to the annual flooding of the Nile river valley and the connection to many major river systems such as the Niger which aided with the production of pottery and iron characteristic to the Meroitic kingdom that allowed for the rise in power of its people. According to partially deciphered Meroitic texts, Meroitic "d" was transcribed in foreign languages as "r", with the native name of the city being Medewi.

=== First Meroitic Period (542–315 BC) ===
The Kings ruled over Napata and Meroë. The seat of government and the royal palace were in Meroë. The Main temple of Amun was located in Napata. Kings and many queens are buried in Nuri, some queens are buried in Meroë, in the West Cemetery. The earliest king was Analmaye (542–538 BC) and the last king of the first phase is Nastasen (335–315 BC)

In the fifth century BC, Greek historian Herodotus described it as "a great city...said to be the mother city of the other Ethiopians."

Excavations revealed evidence of important, high ranking Kushite burials from the Napatan Period (c. 800 – c. 280 BC) in the vicinity of the settlement called the Western Cemetery. The importance of the town gradually increased from the beginning of the Meroitic Period, especially from the reign of Arakamani (c. 280 BC) when the royal burial ground was transferred to Meroë from Napata (Gebel Barkal). Royal burials formed the Pyramids of Meroë, containing the remains of the Kings and Queens of Meroë from c. 300 BC to about 350 AD.

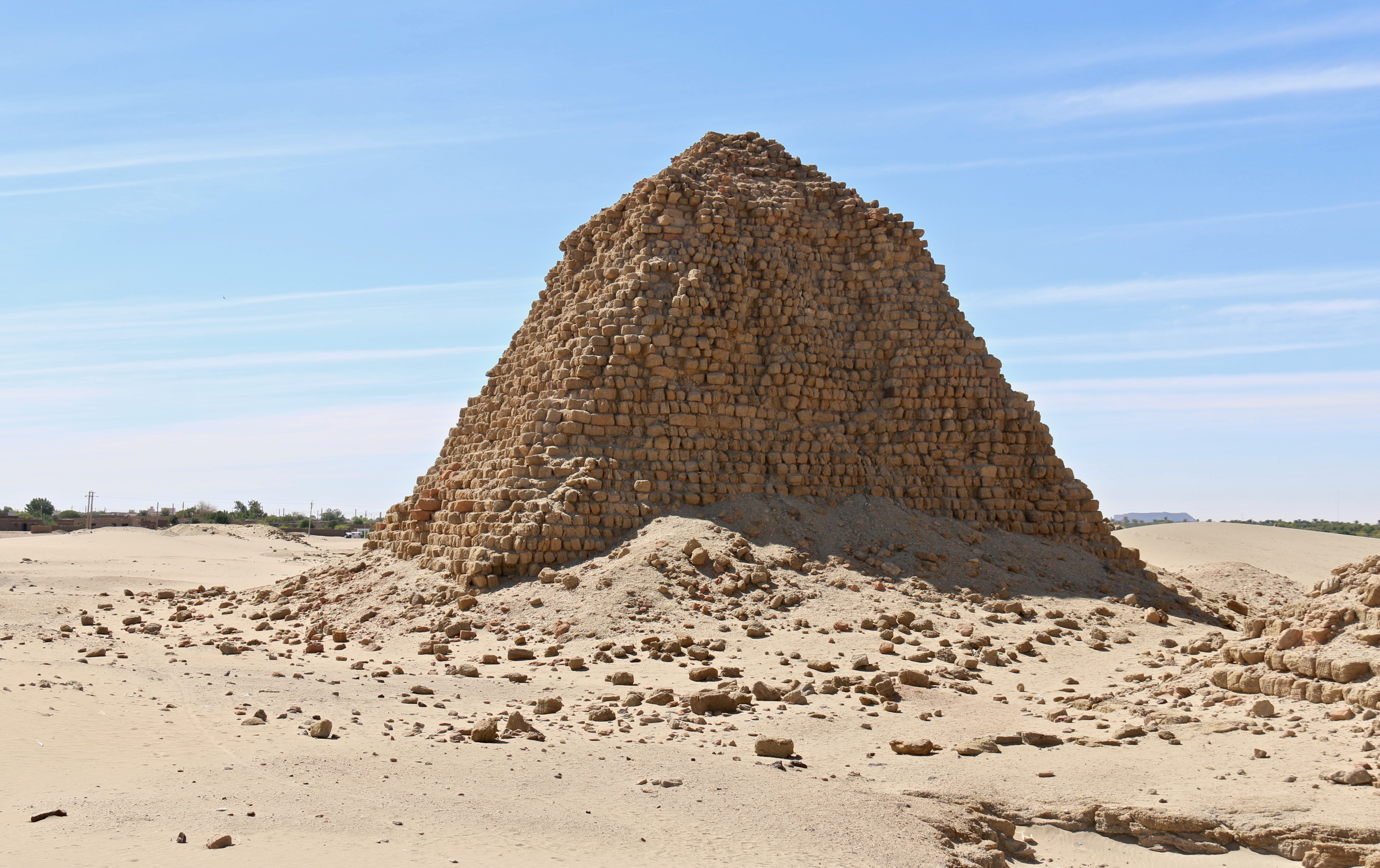
Karkamani's pyramid (513–503 BC), Nuri

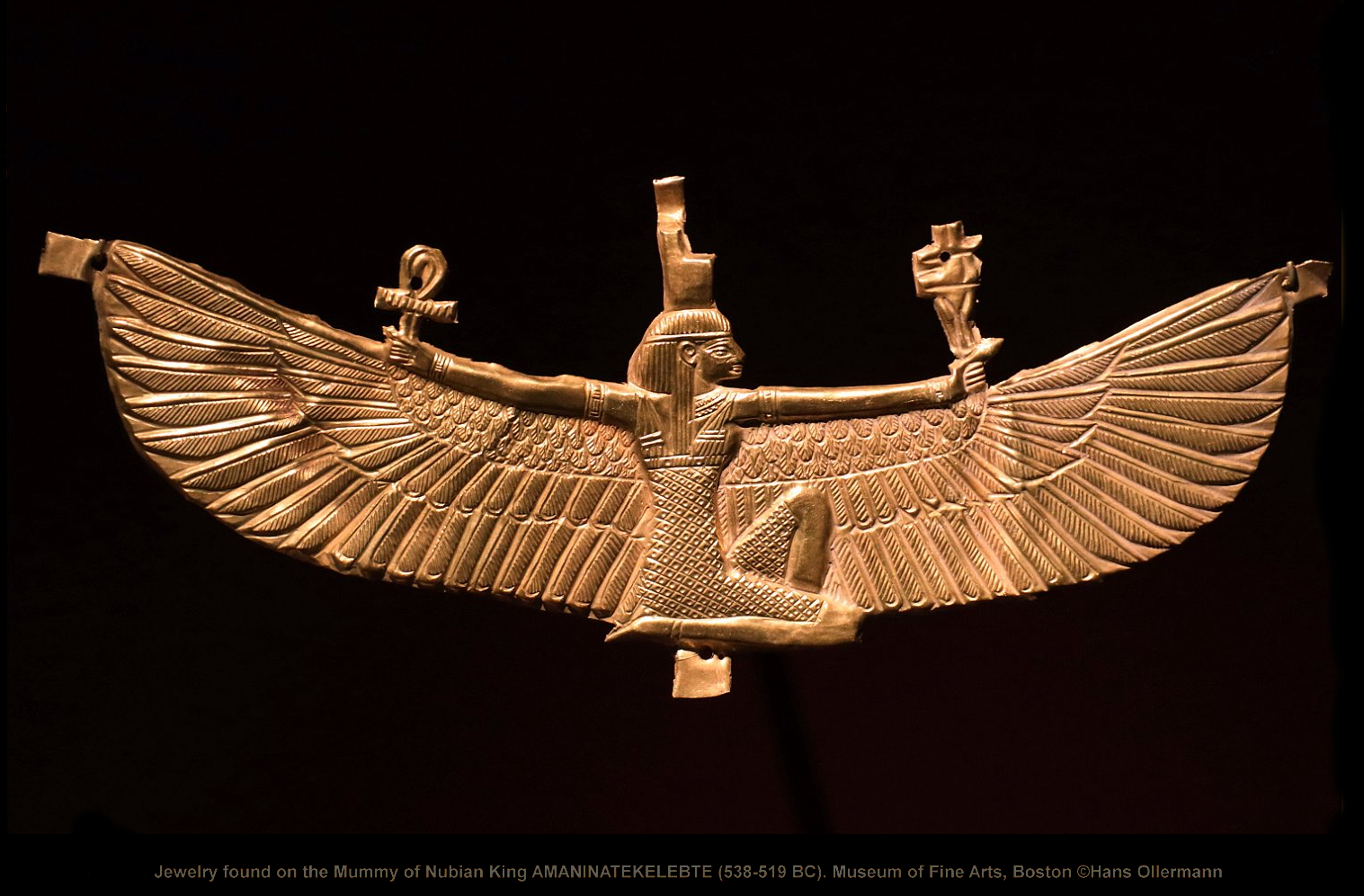
Jewelry found on the mummy of Nubian King Amaninatakilebte (538–519 BC). Museum of Fine Arts, Boston.

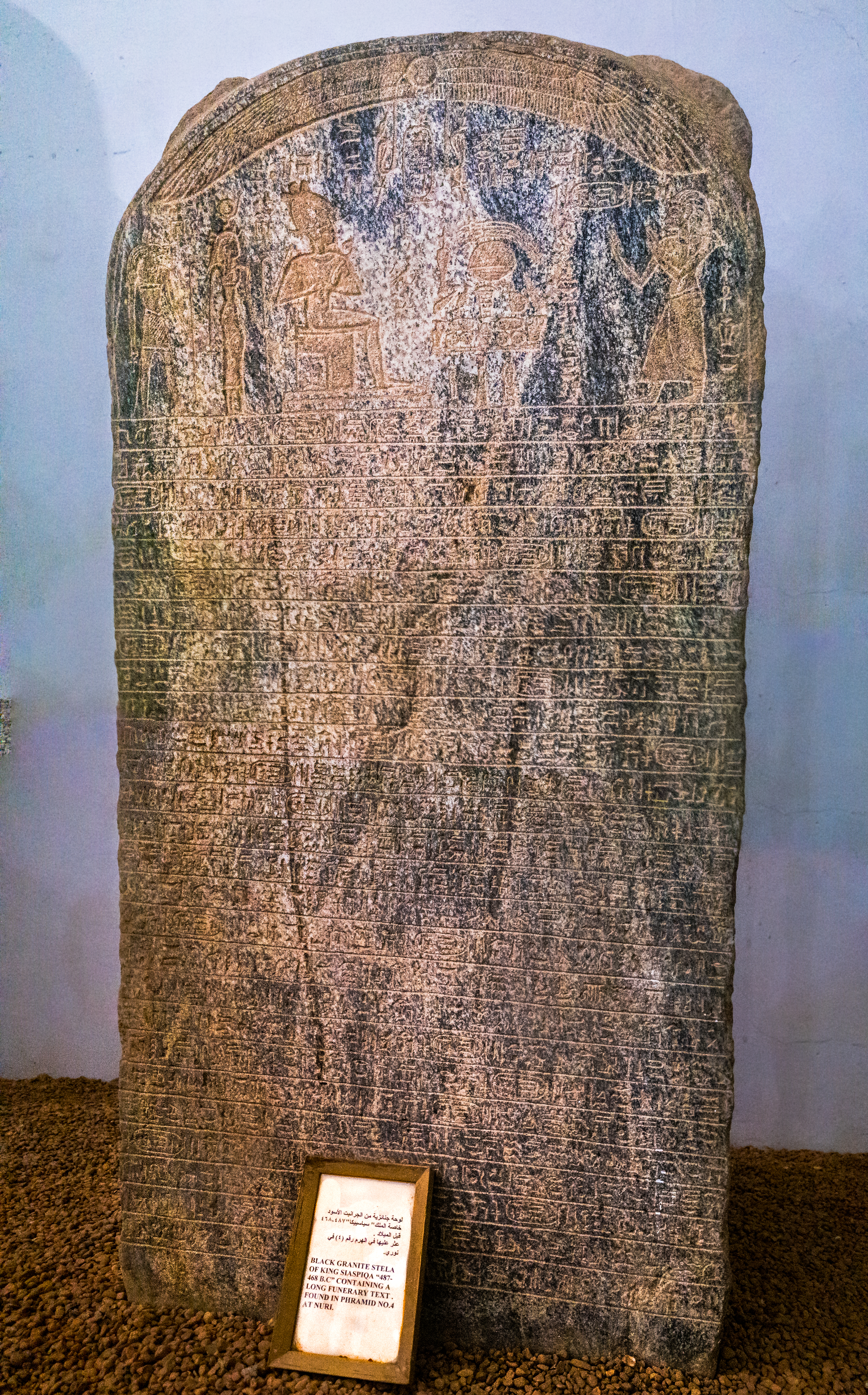
Stela of king Siaspiqa (487–468 BC).

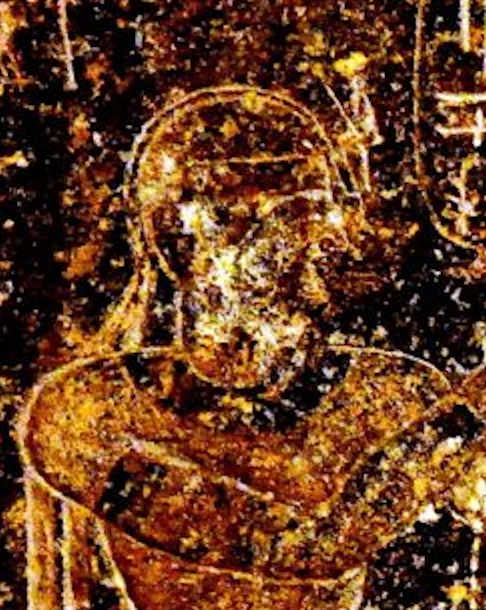
Portrait of King Nastasen (330–310 BC)

=== Second Meroitic Period (3rd century BC) ===
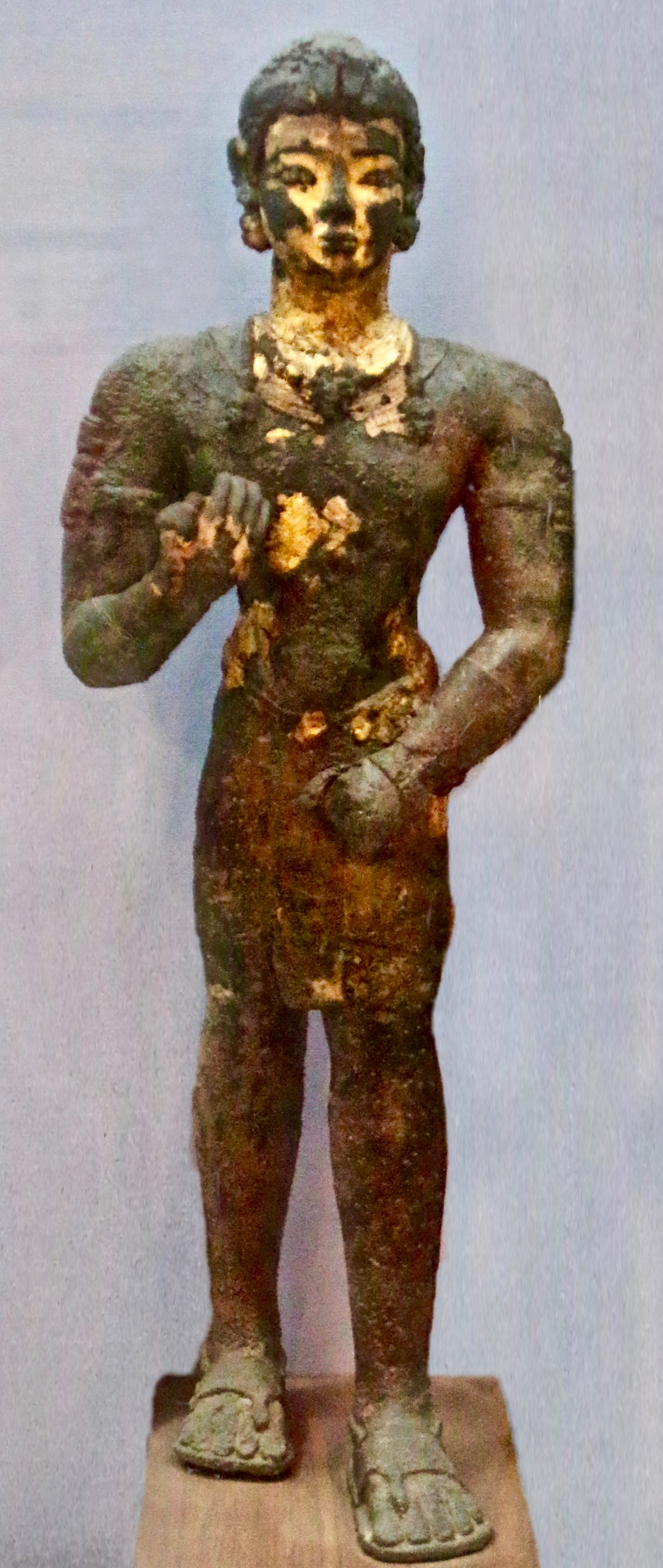
The "Archer King", an unknown king of Meroë, 3rd century BC. National Museum of Sudan.

The seat of government and the royal palace are in Meroë. Kings and many queens are buried in Meroë, in the South Cemetery. Napata remained relevant for the Amun Temple. The first King of the period was Aktisanes (Early 3rd century BC) and the last king of the period was Sabrakamani (first half 3rd century BC).

=== Third Meroitic Period (270 BC – 1st century AD) ===
The seat of government and the royal palace are in Meroë. Kings are buried in Meroë, in the North Cemetery, and Queens in West Cemetery. Napata remained relevant for the Amun Temple. Meroë flourished and many building projects were undertaken. The first king of the period is Arakamani (270–260 BC), the last ruler is Queen Amanitore (mid/late 1st century AD)

Many artifacts were found in Meroitic tombs from around this time.

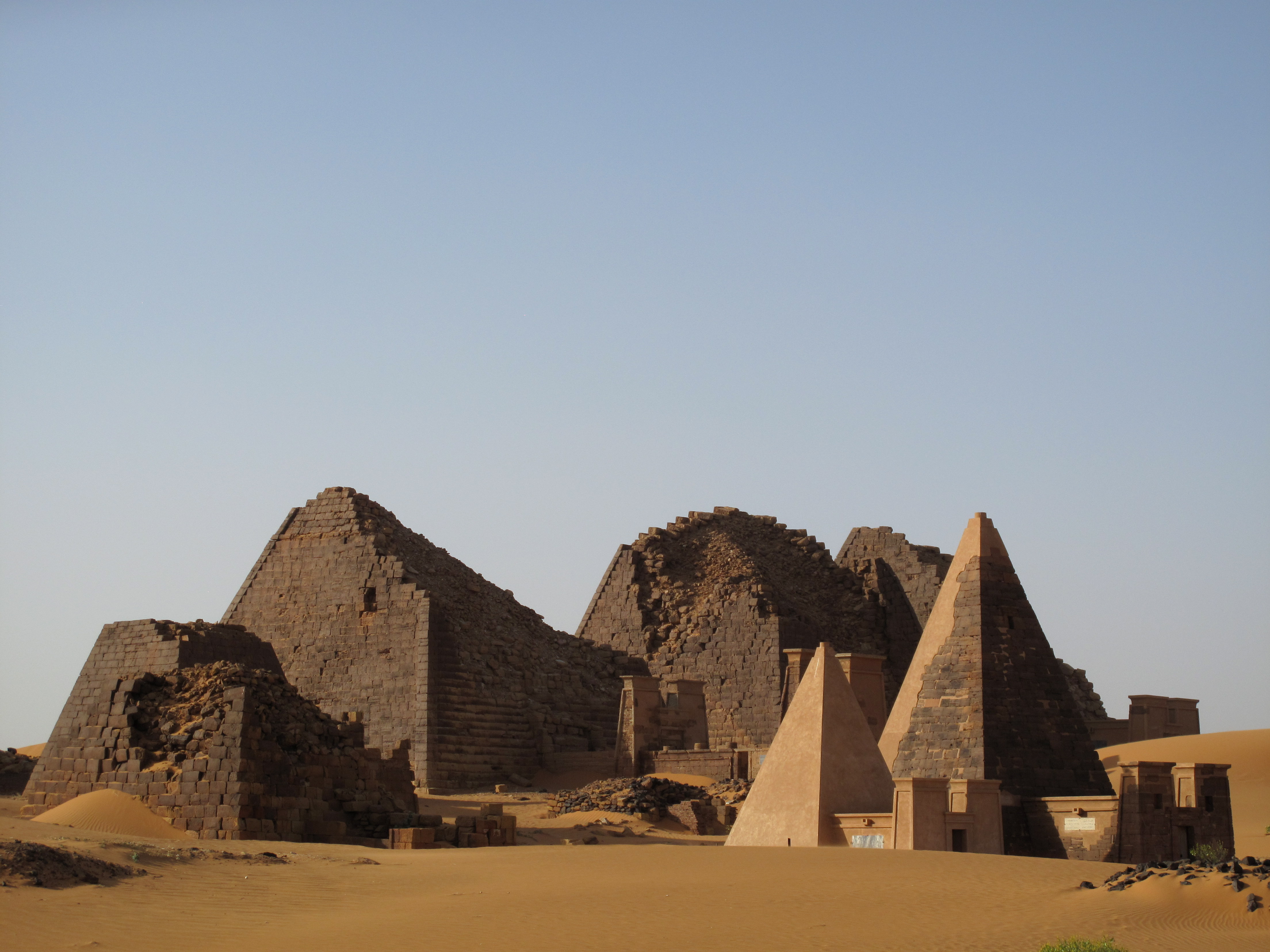
Pyramids of Meroë - Northern Cemetery

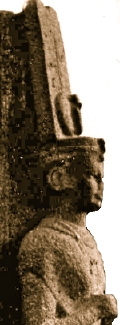
Queen Shanakdakhete (170–150 BC)

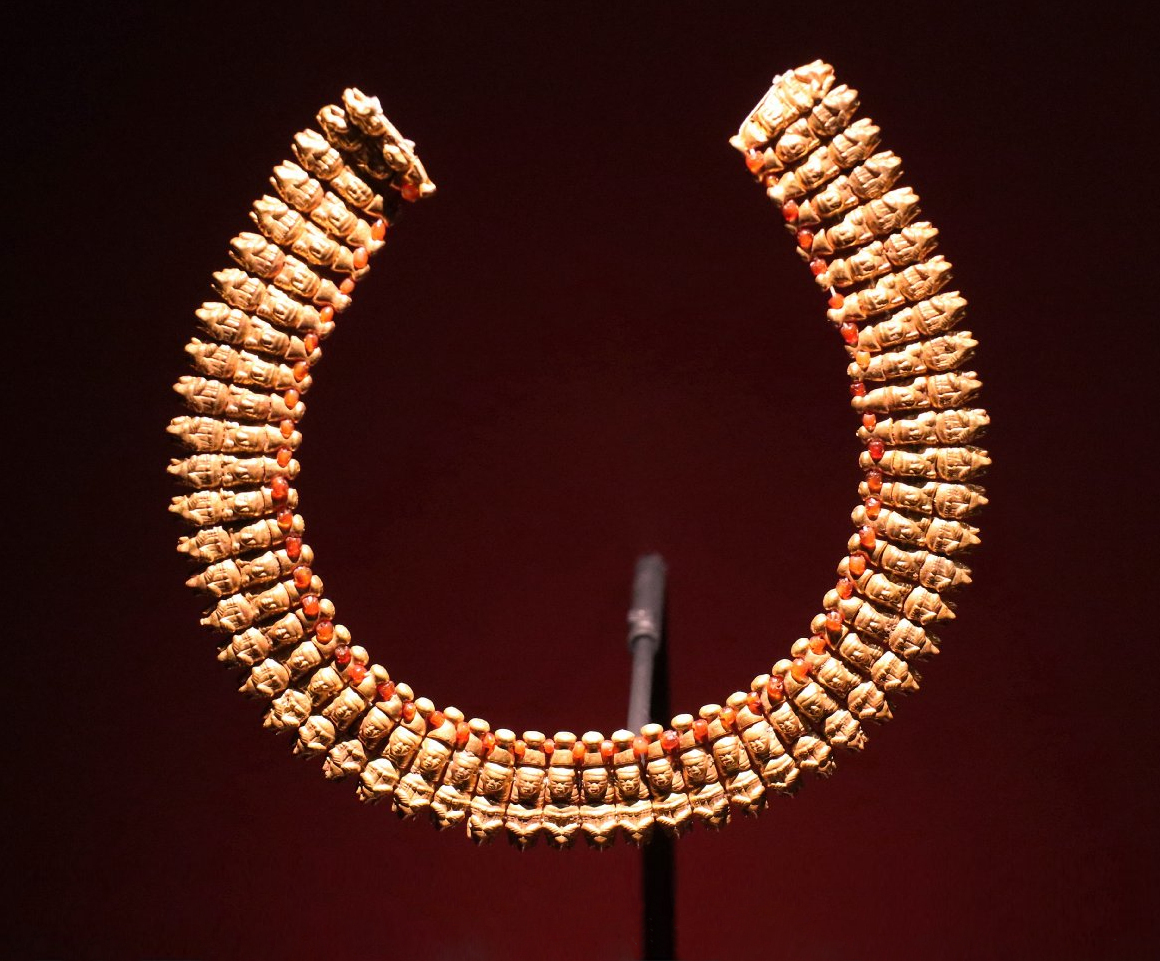
Necklace made of 54 composite human head and ram's head gold pendants with a small carnelian bead between each. Meroitic Period, 270–50 BC

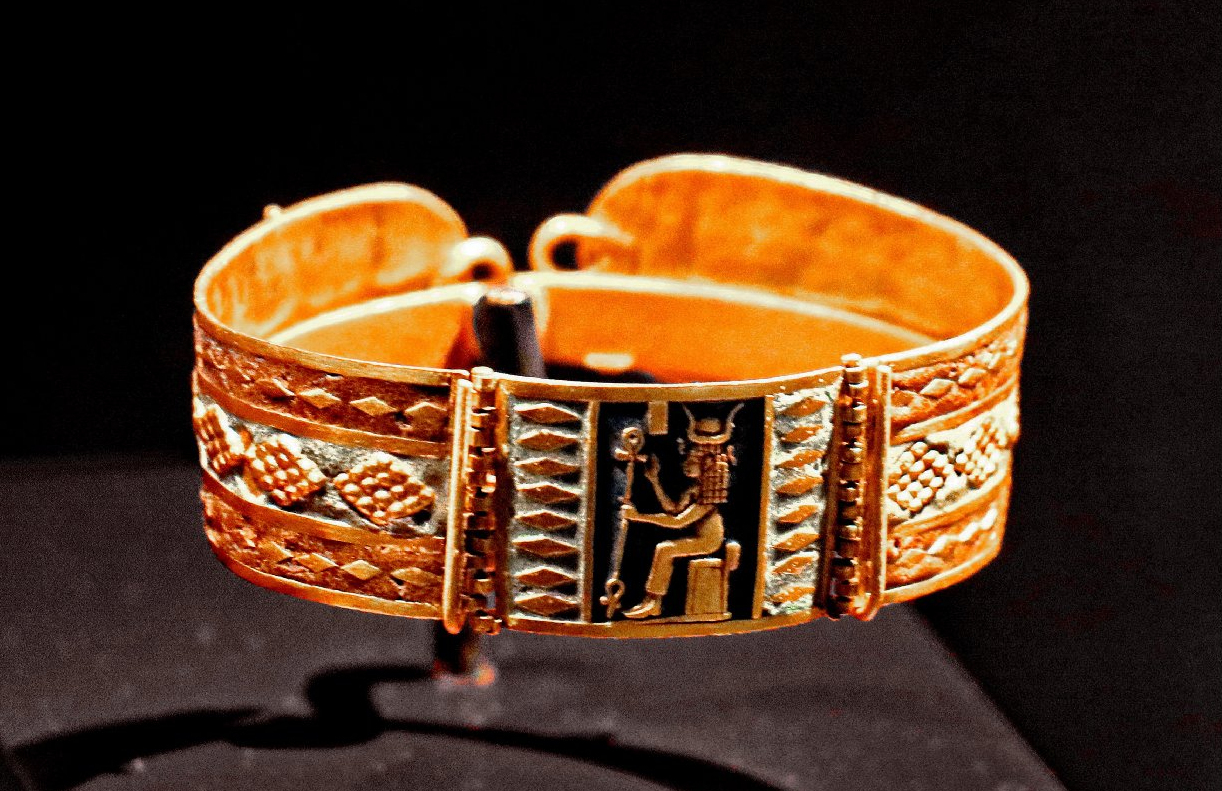
Golden Bracelet found in the tomb of a member of the royal family in Gebel Barkal. 250–100 BC

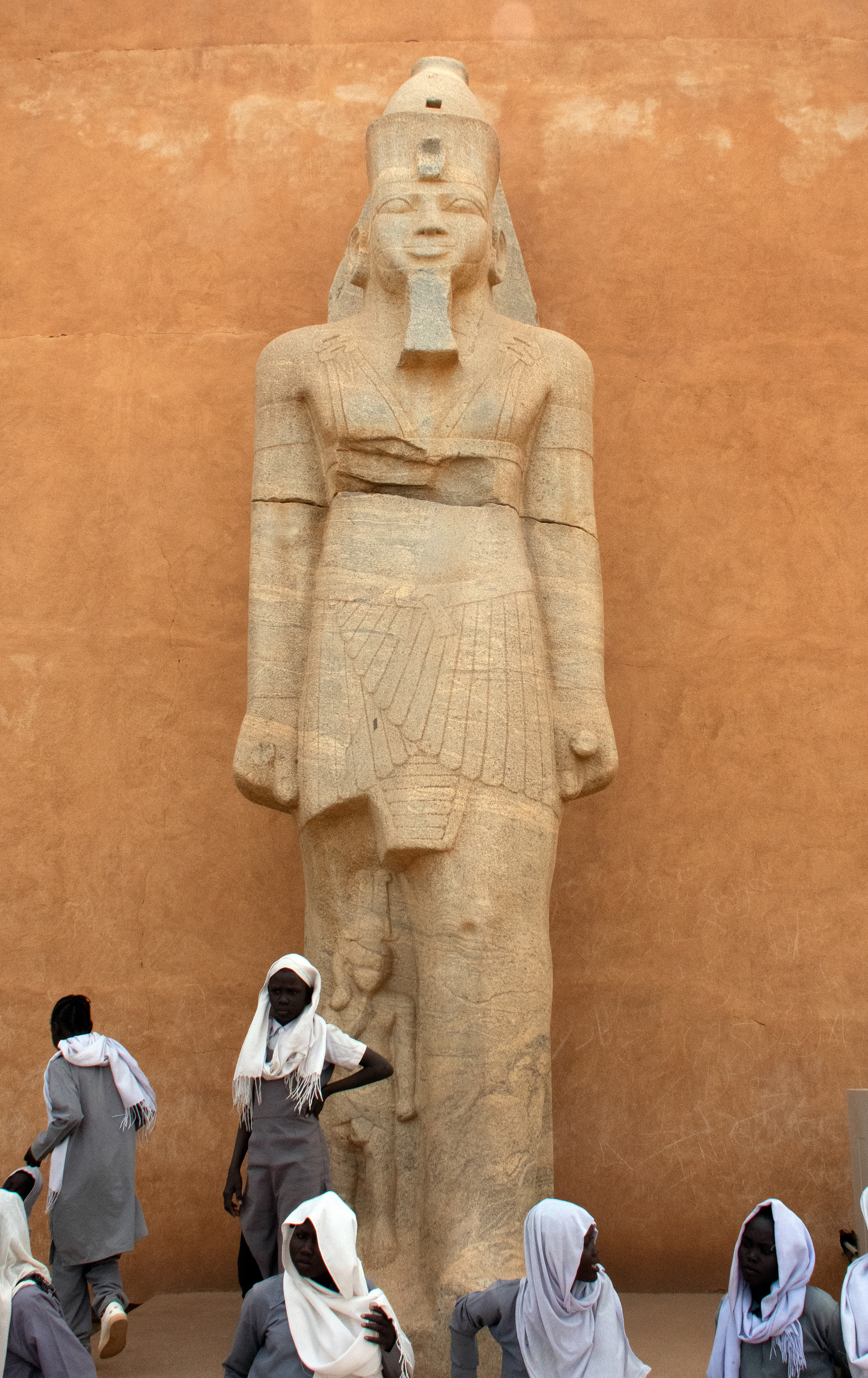
King Natakamani (early 1st century AD)

==== Conflict with Rome ====
Rome's conquest of Egypt led to border skirmishes and incursions by Meroë beyond the Roman borders. In 23 BC, in response to a Nubian attack on southern Egypt, the Roman governor of Egypt, Publius Petronius, invaded Nubia to end the Meroitic raids. He pillaged northern Nubia and sacked Napata (22 BC) before returning home. In retaliation, the Nubians crossed the lower border of Egypt and looted many statues from the Egyptian towns near the first cataract of the Nile at Aswan. Roman forces later reclaimed some of the statues, and others were returned following the peace treaty signed in 22 BC between Rome and Meroë under Augustus and Amanirenas, respectively. One looted head, from a statue of the emperor Augustus, was buried under the steps of a temple in Meroë; it is now kept in the British Museum.

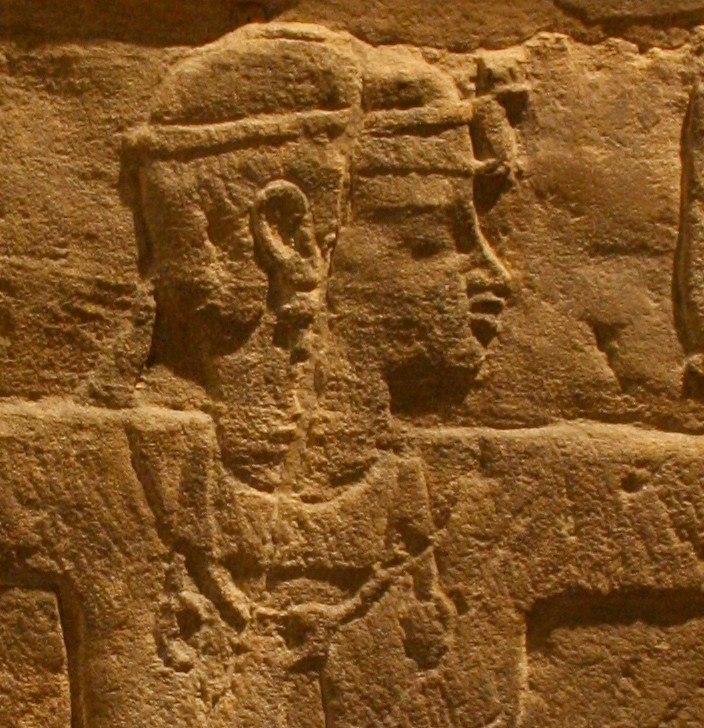
Relief of Kandake Amanitore, circa 50 AD

The next recorded contact between Rome and Meroë was in the autumn of 61 AD. The Emperor Nero sent a party of Praetorian soldiers under the command of a tribune and two centurions into this country, who reached the city of Meroë where they were given an escort, then proceeded up the White Nile until they encountered the swamps of the Sudd. This marked the limit of Roman penetration into Africa.

The period following Petronius' punitive expedition is marked by abundant trade finds at sites in Meroë. L. P. Kirwan provides a short list of finds from archeological sites in that country. The kingdom of Meroë began to fade as a power by the 1st or 2nd century AD, sapped by the war with Roman Egypt and the decline of its traditional industries.

Meroë is mentioned briefly in the 1st century AD Periplus of the Erythraean Sea:

2. On the right-hand coast next below Berenice is the country of the Berbers. Along the shore are the Fish-Eaters, living in scattered caves in the narrow valleys. Farther inland are the Berbers, and beyond them the Wild-flesh-Eaters and Calf-Eaters, each tribe governed by its chief; and behind them, farther inland, in the country towards the west, there lies a city called Meroe.

— Periplus of the Erythraean Sea, Chap.2

=== Fourth Meroitic Period (1st century – 4th century AD) ===
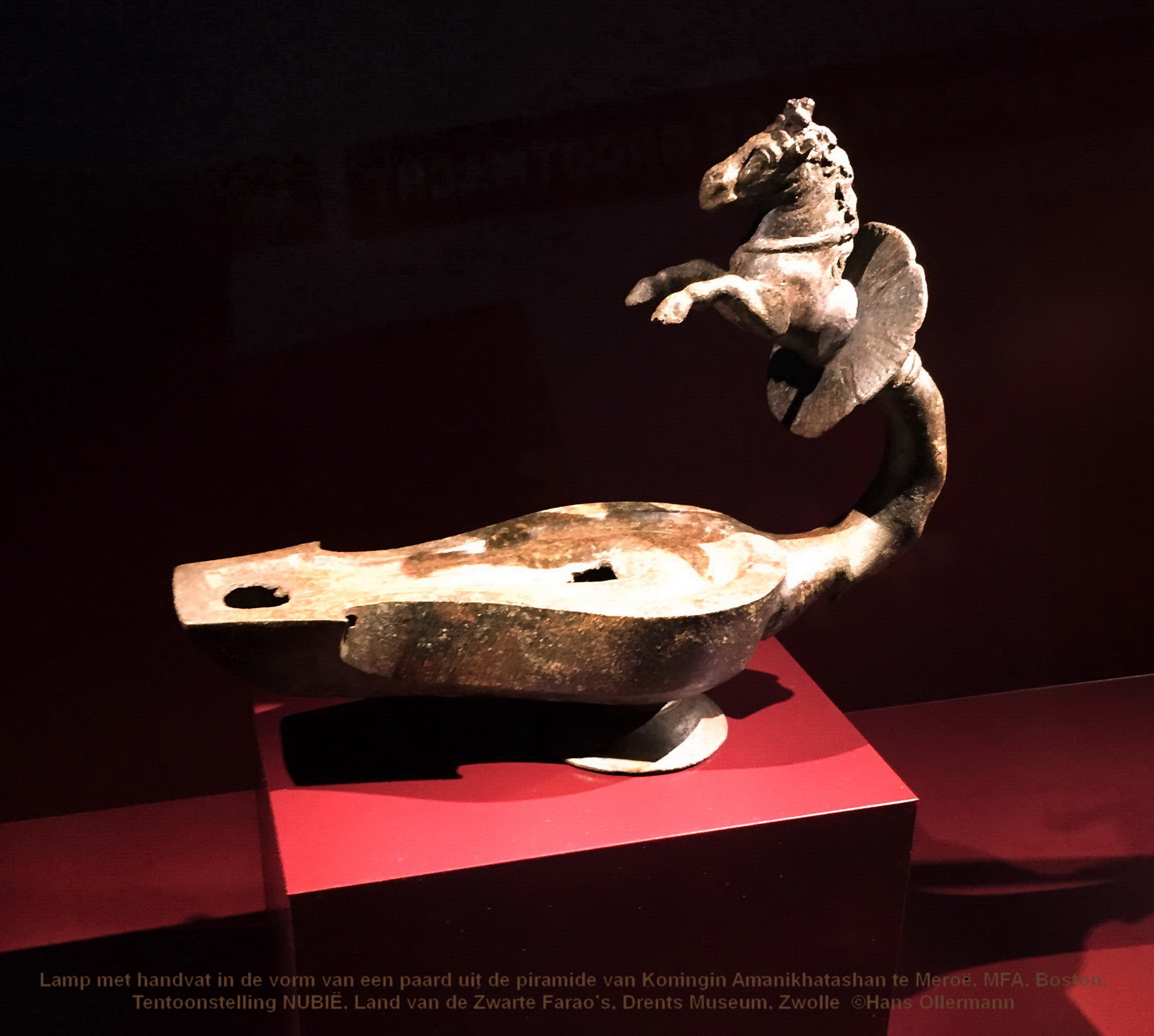
Lamp with handle in the shape of a horse, from the pyramid of Queen Amanikhatashan in Meroë (c. 62 – c. 85 AD). Museum of Fine Arts, Boston

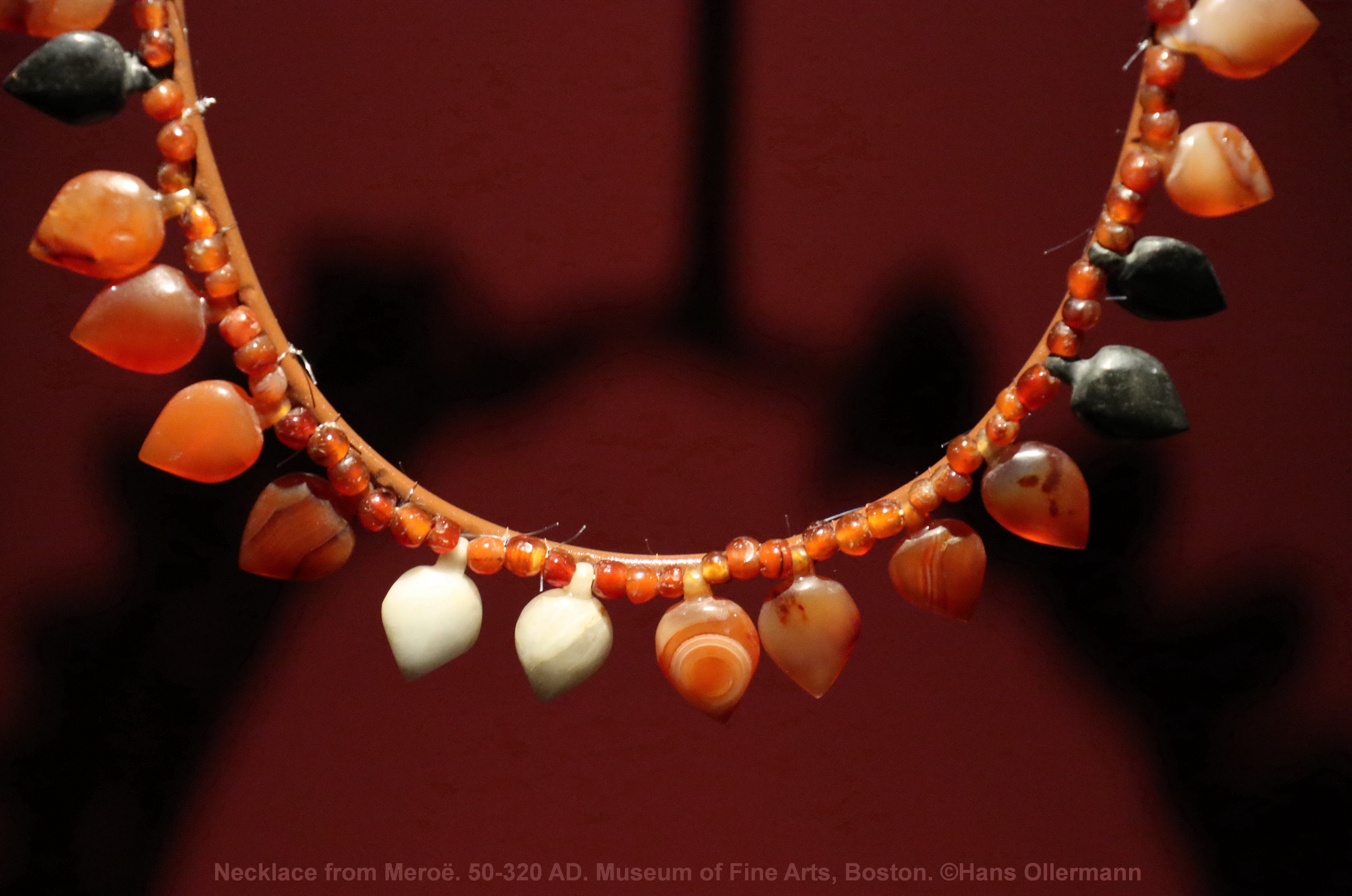
Necklace from Meroë. 50–320 AD. Museum of Fine Arts, Boston.

Kings were buried in Meroë, in the North Cemetery, and Queens in West Cemetery. In 350 AD Meroë was destroyed by Axum. The first king of the fourth period was Shorkaror (1st century AD), while the last rulers may have been King Yesebokheamani or King Talakhidamani in the 4th century AD. The Aksumite presence was short lived before Meroë was taken by the Kingdom of Alodia.

A stele of Ge'ez of an unnamed ruler of the Kingdom of Aksum thought to be Ezana was found at the site of Meroë; from its description, in Greek, he was "King of the Aksumites and the Omerites," (i.e. of Aksum and Himyar) it is likely this king ruled sometime around 330. Another inscription in Greek gives the regnal claims of Ezana:

I, Ezana, King of the Axumites and Himyarites and of Reeidan and of the Sabaites and of Sileel (?) and of Hasa and of the Bougaites and of Taimo...

— Greek inscription of Ezana.

While some authorities interpret these inscriptions as proof that the Axumites destroyed the Kingdom of Kush, others note that archeological evidence points to an economic and political decline in Meroë around 300.

== Meroë in Jewish legend ==
Jewish oral tradition avers that Moses, in his younger years, had led an Egyptian military expedition into Sudan (Kush), as far as the city of Meroë, which was then called Saba. The city was built near the confluence of two great rivers and was encircled by a formidable wall, and governed by a renegade king. To ensure the safety of his men who traversed that desert country, Moses had invented a stratagem whereby the Egyptian army would carry along with them baskets of sedge, each containing an ibis, only to be released when they approached the enemy's country. The purpose of the birds was to kill the deadly serpents that lay all about that country. Having successfully laid siege to the city, the city was eventually subdued by the betrayal of the king's daughter, who had agreed to deliver the city to Moses on condition that he would consummate a marriage with her, under the solemn assurance of an oath. (Note: The same episode, with slight variation, is also related in Sefer Ha-Yashar, Tel-Aviv ca. 1965, pp. 192–195 (Hebrew) and in Gedaliah ibn Yahya's Shalshelet Ha-Kabbalah, Jerusalem 1962, p. 22 (p. 31 in PDF) (Hebrew); Pseudo-Jonathan – the Aramaic Targum of pseudo-Jonathan ben Uziel (ed. Dr. M. Ginsburger), 2nd edition, Jerusalem 1974, p. 248.)

== Civilization ==
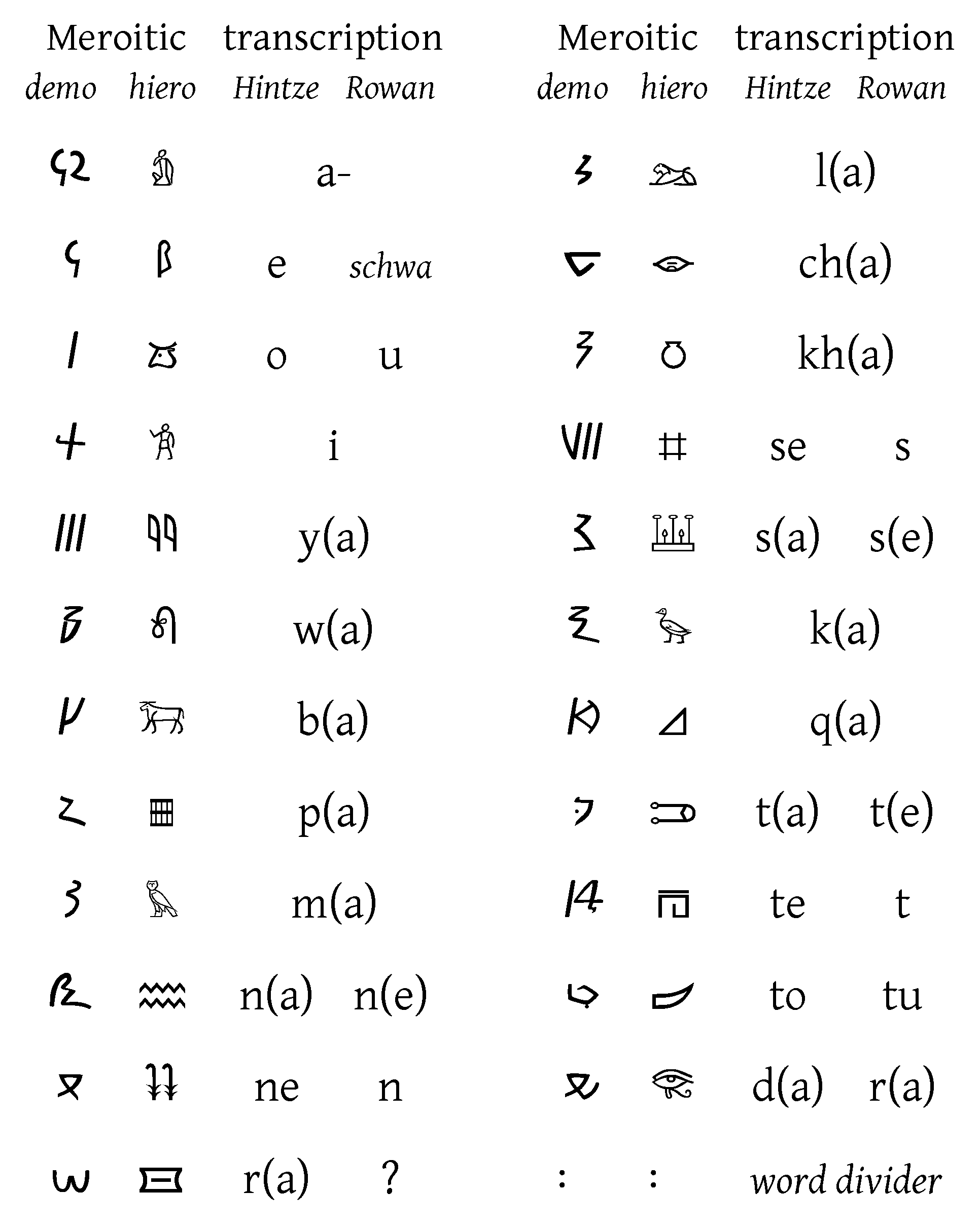
Meroitic script

Meroë was the base of a flourishing kingdom whose wealth was centered around a strong iron industry. Metalworking is believed to have taken place in Meroë, possibly through bloomeries and blast furnaces. Archibald Sayce reportedly referred to it as "the Birmingham of Africa", because of perceived vast production and trade of iron (a contention that is a matter of debate in modern scholarship).

The centralized control of production within the Meroitic empire and distribution of certain crafts and manufactures may have been politically important with their iron industry and pottery crafts gaining the most significant attention. The Meroitic settlements were oriented in a savannah orientation with the varying of permanent and less permanent agricultural settlements can be attributed to the exploitation of rainlands and savannah-oriented forms of subsistence.

At the time, iron was one of the most important metals worldwide, and Meroitic metalworkers were among the best in the world. Meroë traded ivory, slaves, rare skins, ostrich feathers, copper, and ebony. Meroë also exported textiles and jewelry. Their textiles were based on cotton and working on this product reached its highest achievement in Nubia around 400 BC. Furthermore, Nubia was very rich in gold. It is possible that the Egyptian word for gold, nub, was the source of name of Nubia. Trade in "exotic" animals from farther south in Africa was another feature of their economy.

Apart from the iron trade, pottery was a widespread and prominent industry in the Meroë kingdom. The production of fine and elaborately decorated wares was a strong tradition within the middle Nile. Such productions carried considerable social significance and are believed to be involved in mortuary rites. The long history of goods imported into the Meroitic empire and their subsequent distribution provides insight into the social and political workings of the Meroitic state. The major determinant of production was attributed to the availability of labor rather than the political power associated with land. Power was associated with control of people rather than control of territory.

The sakia was used to move water, in conjunction with irrigation, to increase crop production.

At its peak, the rulers of Meroë controlled the Nile Valley north to south, over a straight-line distance of more than 1,000 km (620 mi).

The King of Meroë was an autocratic ruler who shared his authority only with the Queen Mother, or Kandake. However, the role of the Queen Mother remains obscure. The administration consisted of treasurers, seal bearers, heads of archives and chief scribes, among others.

Although the people of Meroë also had southern deities such as Apedemak, the lion-son of Sekhmet (or Bast, depending upon the region), they also continued worshipping ancient Egyptian gods that they had brought with them. Among these deities were Amun, Tefnut, Horus, Isis, Thoth and Satis, though to a lesser extent.

The collapse of their external trade with other Nile Valley states may be considered one of the prime causes of the decline of royal power and disintegration of the Meroitic state in the 3rd and 4th centuries AD.

== Language ==
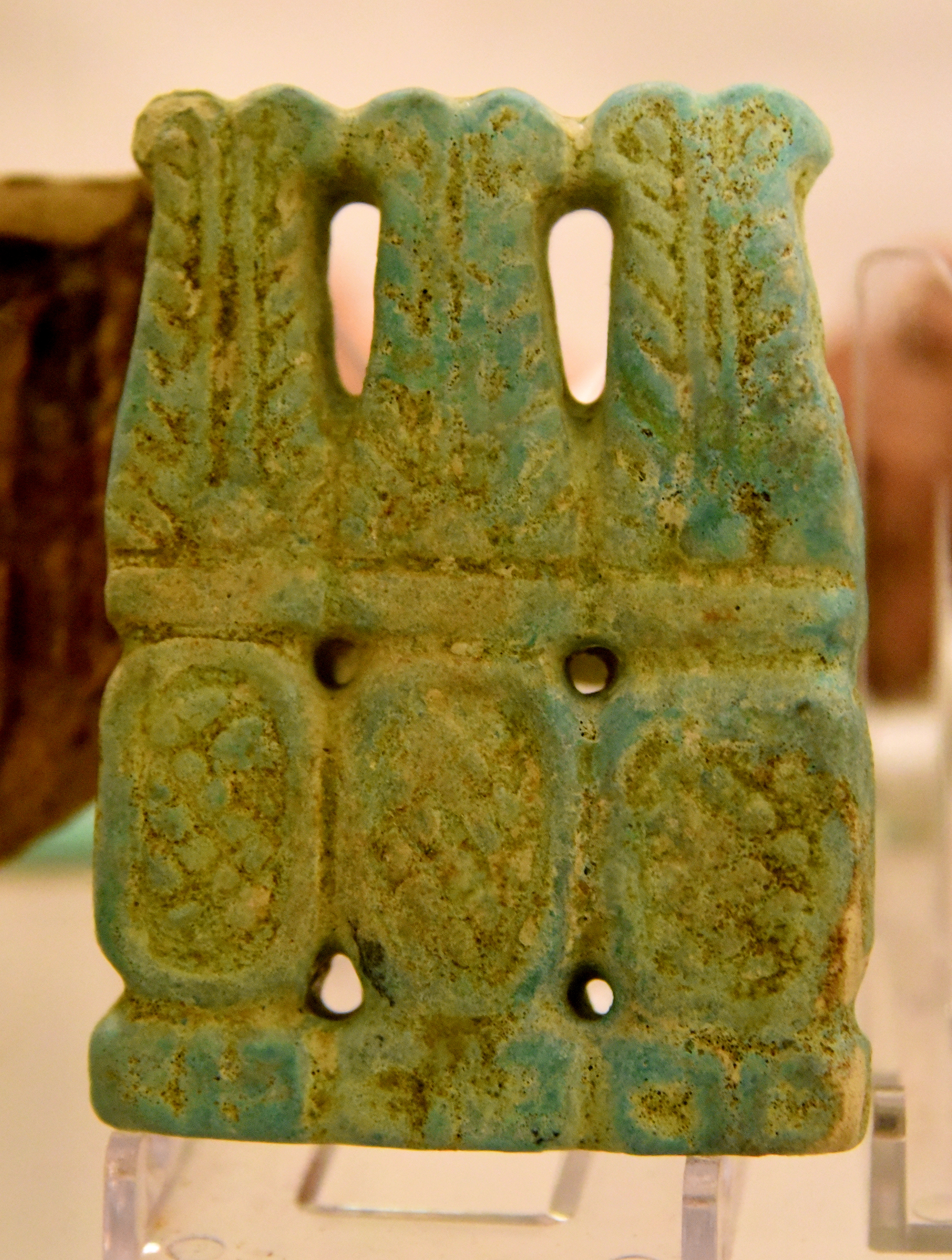
Stamp or thumb ring in the form of three cartouches (enclosing dot pattern). Each topped with two plumes and sun disc. Faience. From Meroë. Meroitic period. Petrie Museum of Egyptian Archaeology

The Meroitic language was spoken in Meroë and the Sudan during the Meroitic period (attested from 300 BC). It became extinct around 400 AD. The language was written in two forms of the Meroitic alphabet: Meroitic Cursive, which was written with a stylus and was used for general record-keeping; and Meroitic Hieroglyphic, which was carved in stone or used for royal or religious documents. It is not well understood due to the scarcity of bilingual texts. The earliest inscription in Meroitic writing dates from between 180 and 170 BC. These hieroglyphics were found engraved on the temple of Queen Shanakdakhete. Meroitic Cursive is written horizontally, and reads from right to left like all Semitic orthographies.

By the 3rd century BC, a new indigenous alphabet, the Meroitic, consisting of twenty-three letters, replaced Egyptian script. The Meroitic script is an alphabetic script originally derived from Egyptian hieroglyphs, used to write the Meroitic language of the Kingdom of Kush. It was developed in the Napatan Period (c. 700 – 300 BC), and first appears in the 2nd century BC. For a time, it was also possibly used to write the Nubian language of the successor Nubian kingdoms.

It is uncertain to which language family the Meroitic language is related. Kirsty Rowan suggests that Meroitic, like the Egyptian language, belongs to the Afro-Asiatic family. She bases this on its sound inventory and phonotactics, which, she proposes, are similar to those of the Afro-Asiatic languages and dissimilar from those of the Nilo-Saharan languages. Claude Rilly, based on its syntax, morphology, and known vocabulary, proposes that Meroitic, like the Nobiin language, instead belongs to the Eastern Sudanic branch of the Nilo-Saharan family.

== Archaeology ==
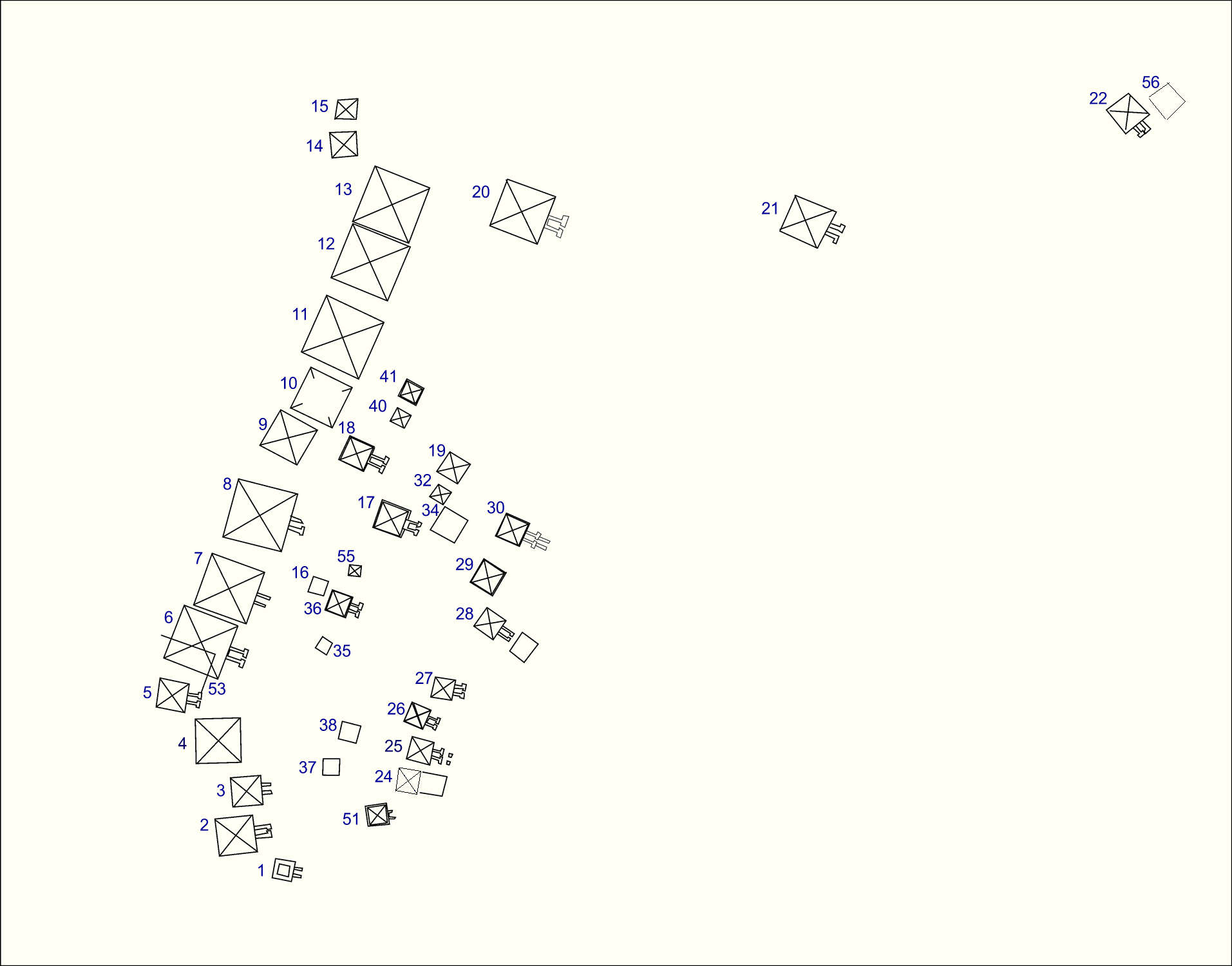
Plan of the North pyramid field at Meroë.

The site of Meroë was brought to the knowledge of Europeans in 1821 by the French mineralogist Frédéric Cailliaud (1787–1869), who published an illustrated in-folio describing the ruins. His work included the first publication of the southernmost known Latin inscription. (Note: CIL III, 83. This inscription was subsequently published by Lepsius, who brought the stone back to Berlin. Although thought lost, it was recently rediscovered in the Skulpturensammlung und Museum für Byzantinische Kunst of the Staatliche Museen in Berlin)

As Margoliouth notes in the 1911 Encyclopedia Britannica, small scale excavations occurred in 1834, led by Giuseppe Ferlini, who, as Margoliouth states, "discovered (or professed to discover) various antiquities, chiefly in the form of jewelry, now in the museums of Berlin and Munich." Margoliouth continues,

The ruins were examined in 1844 by C. R. Lepsius, who brought many plans, sketches and copies, besides actual antiquities, to Berlin. Further excavations were carried on by E. A. Wallis Budge in the years 1902 and 1905, the results of which are recorded in his work, The Egyptian Sudan: its History and Monuments… Troops were furnished by Sir Reginald Wingate, governor of the Sudan, who made paths to and between the pyramids, and sank shafts, &c. It was found that the pyramids were regularly built over sepulchral chambers, containing the remains of bodies either burned or buried without being mummified. The most interesting objects found were the reliefs on the chapel walls, already described by Lepsius, and containing the names with representations of queens and some kings, with some chapters of the Book of the Dead; some steles with inscriptions in the Meroitic language, and some vessels of metal and earthenware. The best of the reliefs were taken down stone by stone in 1905, and set up partly in the British Museum and partly in the museum at Khartoum. In 1910, in consequence of a report by Professor Archibald Sayce, excavations were commenced in the mounds of the town and the necropolis by J[ohn] Garstang on behalf of the University of Liverpool, and the ruins of a palace and several temples were discovered, built by the Meroite kings.

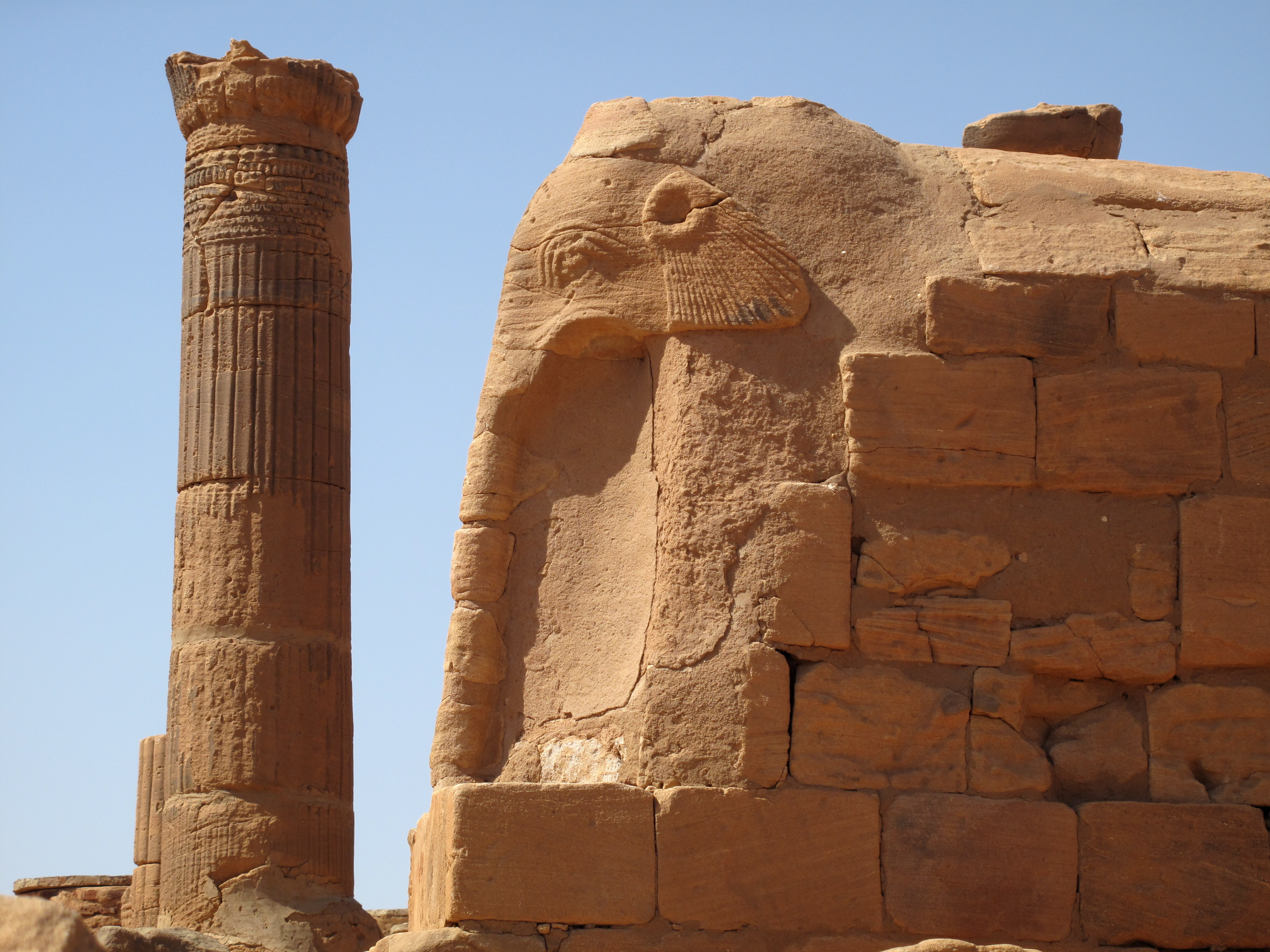
Column and elephant - part of temple complex in Musawwarat es-Sufra

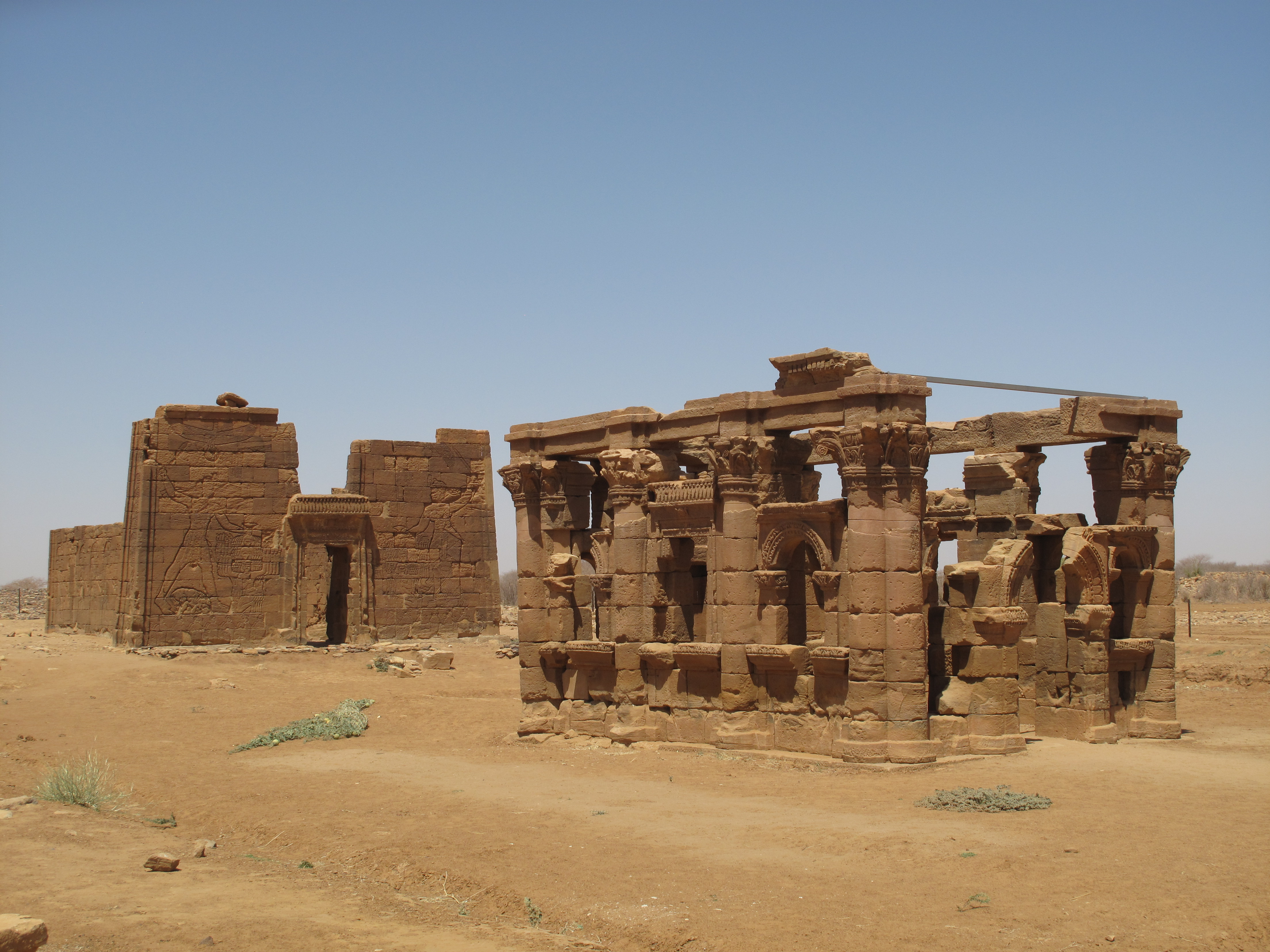
Roman Kiosk and Apedemak Temple in Naqa

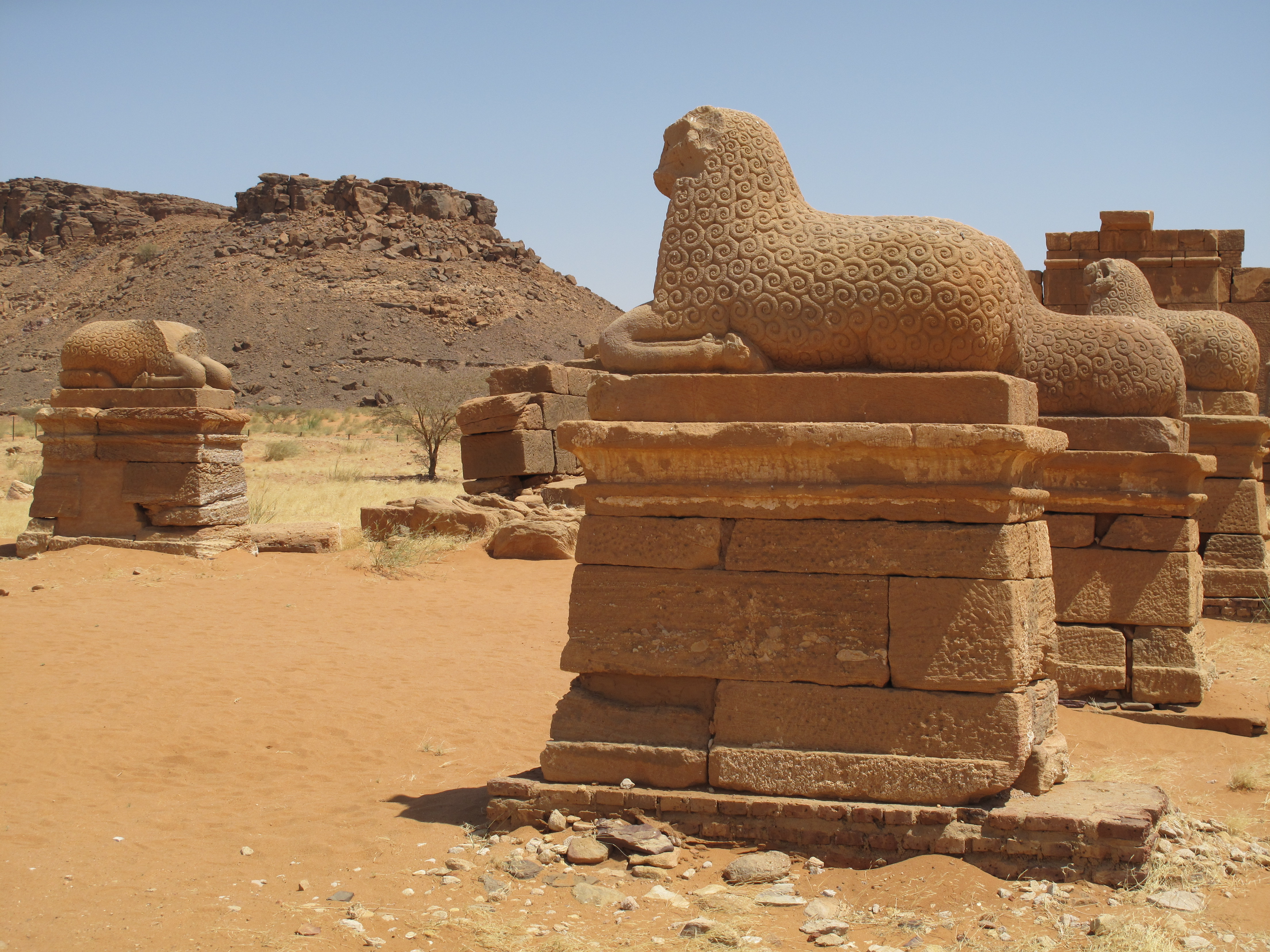
Colonnade of rams in front of Amun-Ra temple in Naqa

== World Heritage listing ==
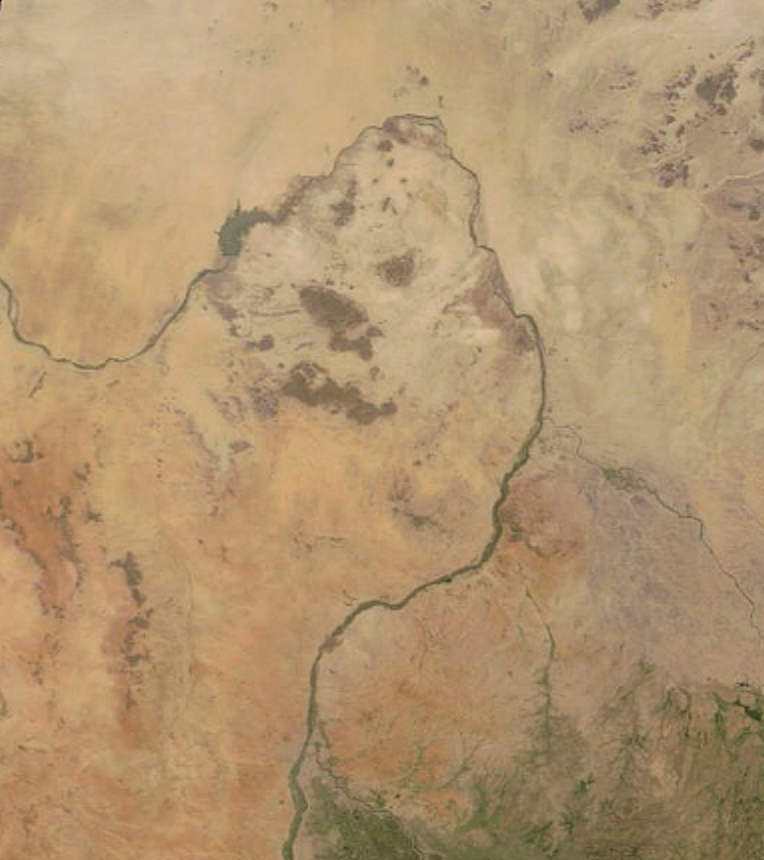
A modern satellite view of the region of Meroë (October 2020)

In June 2011, the Archeological Sites of Meroë were listed by UNESCO as World Heritage Sites.

During the Sudanese civil war (2023–present) on 14 January 2024, the Sudanese Armed Forces launched airstrikes in the ancient Meroitic sites of Naqa and Musawwarat es-Sufra, which are both designated UNESCO World Heritage Sites, following incursions there by the Rapid Support Forces.

== See also ==
- Sedeinga pyramids
- List of modern names for biblical place names
- Kandake
