= Art of ancient Egypt =

Art of ancient Egypt

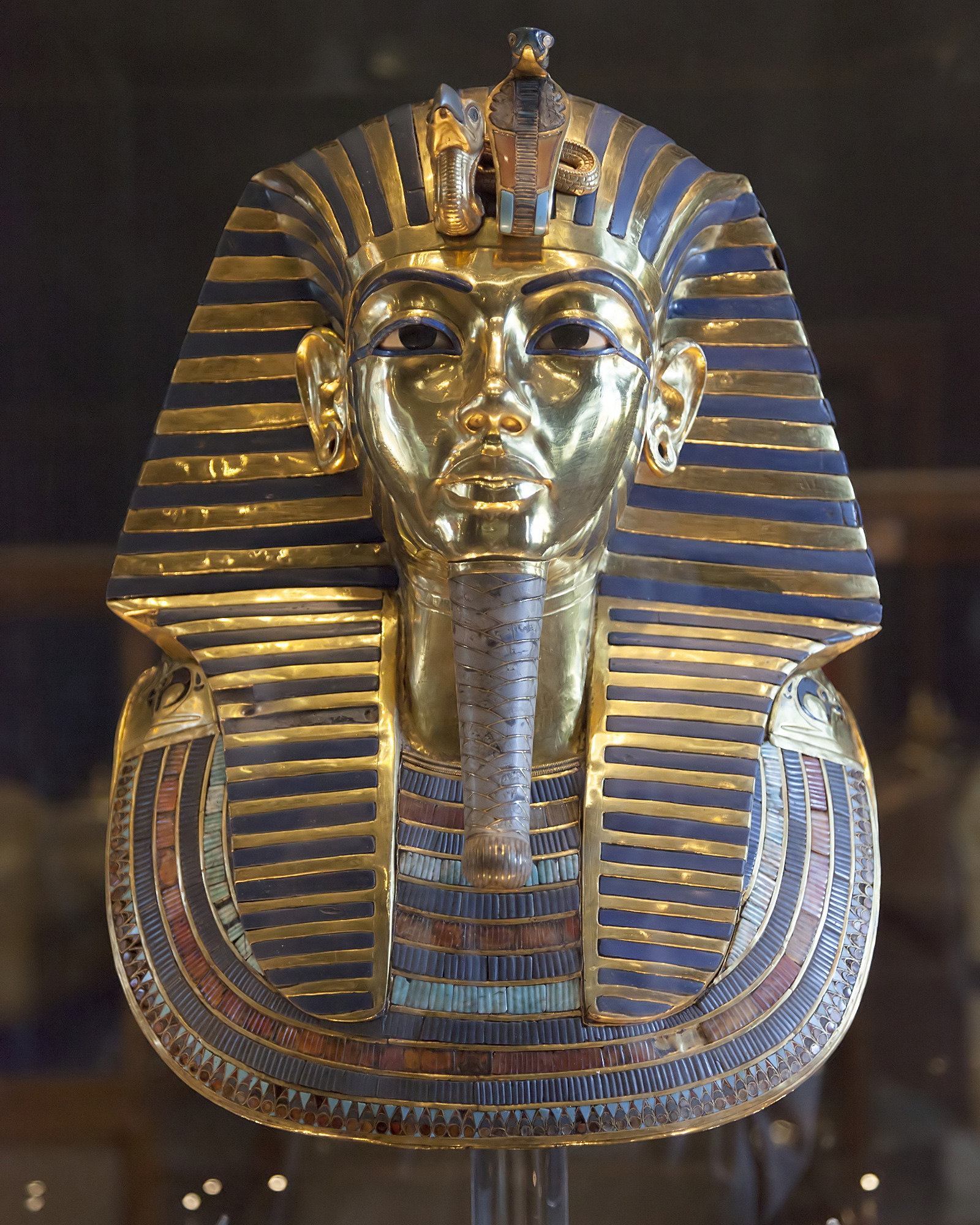
The Mask of Tutankhamun; c. 1327 BC; gold, glass and semi-precious stones; height: 54 cm (21 in); Egyptian Museum (Cairo)

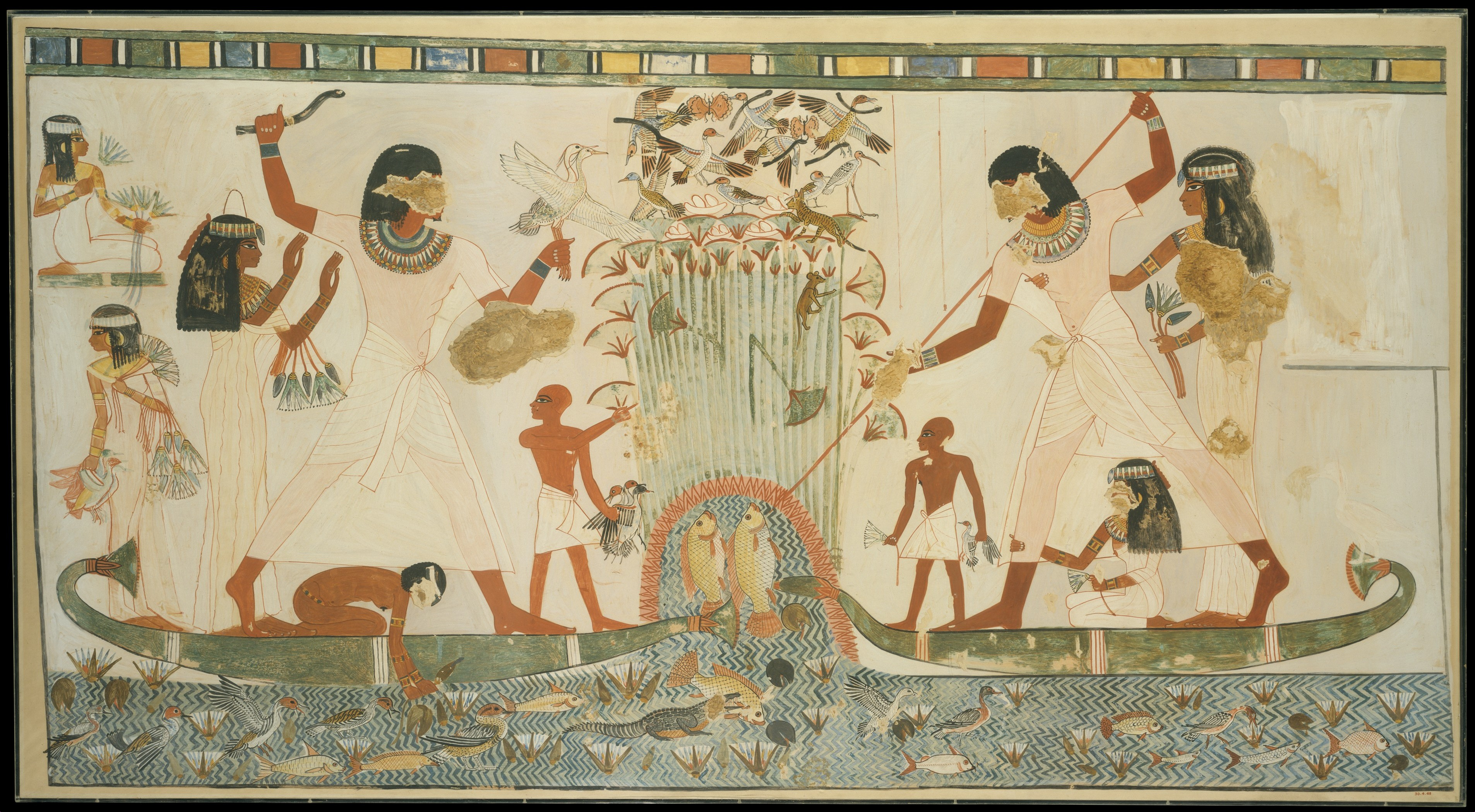
Menna and Family Hunting in the Marshes, Tomb of Menna, 14th century BC

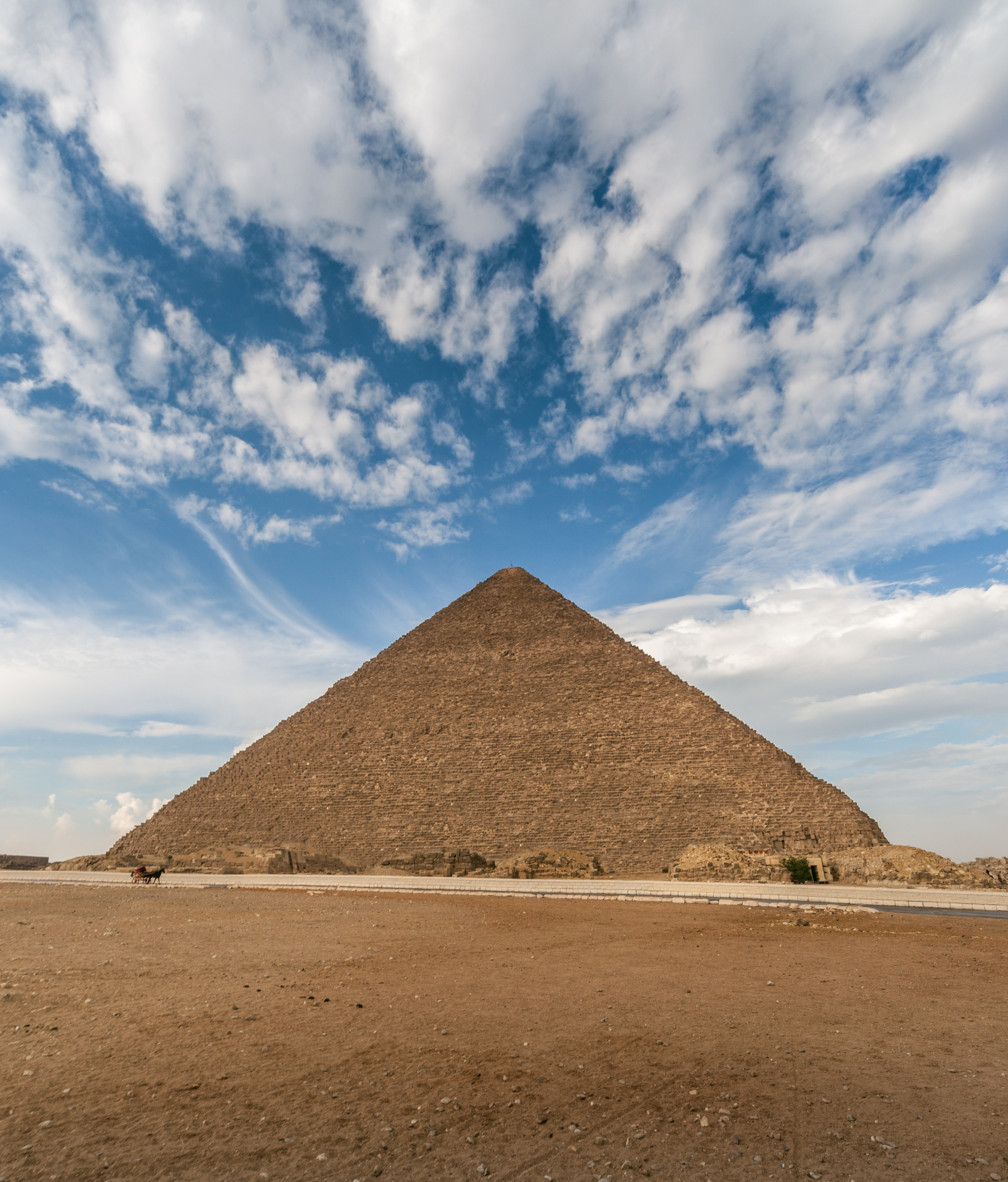
The Great Pyramid of Giza, constructed between c. 2580–2560 BC during the Old Kingdom period

Ancient Egyptian art refers to art produced in ancient Egypt between the 6th millennium BC and the 4th century AD, spanning from Prehistoric Egypt until the Christianization of Roman Egypt. It includes paintings, sculptures, drawings on papyrus, faience, jewelry, ivories, architecture, and other art media. It was a conservative tradition whose style changed very little over time. Much of the surviving examples comes from tombs and monuments, giving insight into the ancient Egyptian afterlife beliefs like the Egyptian mummies.

The ancient Egyptian language had no word for "art". Artworks served an essentially functional purpose that was bound with religion and ideology. To render a subject in art was to grant it permanence; thus, ancient Egyptian art portrayed an idealized and unrealistic version of the world. There was no significant tradition of individual artistic expression since art served a wider and cosmic purpose of maintaining order (Ma'at).

== Art of Pre-Dynastic Egypt (6000–3000 BC) ==
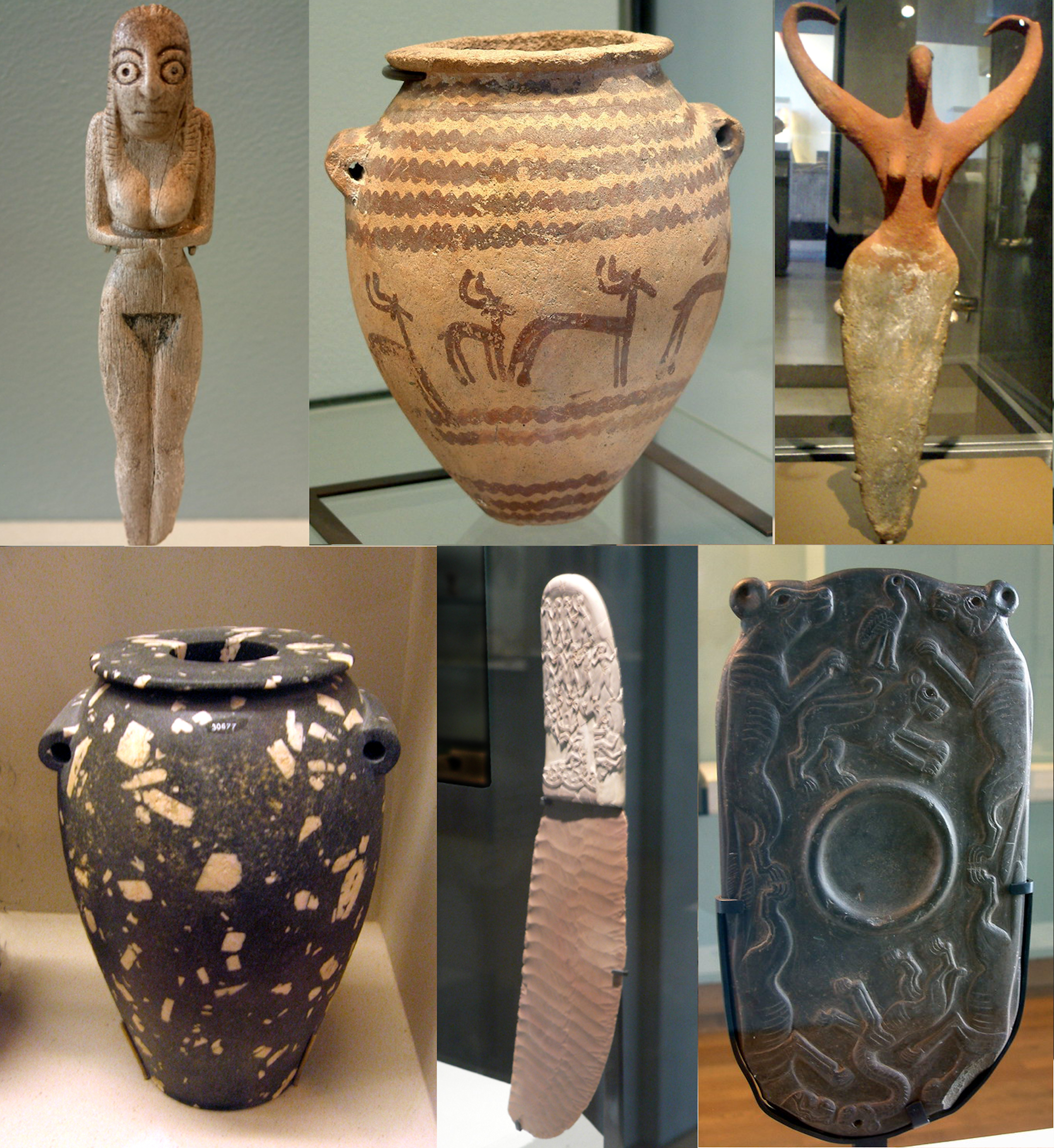
Artifacts of Egypt from the Prehistoric period, 4400–3100 BC: clockwise from top left: a Badarian ivory figurine, a Naqada jar, a Bat figurine, a cosmetic palette, a flint knife, and a diorite vase.

Pre-Dynastic Egypt, corresponding to the Neolithic period of the prehistory of Egypt, spanned from c. 6000 BC to the beginning of the Early Dynastic Period, around 3100 BC.

Continued expansion of the desert forced the early ancestors of the Egyptians to settle around the Nile and adopt a more sedentary lifestyle during the Neolithic. The period from 9000 to 6000 BC has left very little archaeological evidence, but around 6000 BC, Neolithic settlements began to appear all over Egypt. Studies based on morphological, genetic, and archaeological data have attributed these settlements to migrants from the Fertile Crescent returning during the Neolithic Revolution, bringing agriculture to the region.

=== Merimde culture (5000–4200 BC) ===
From about 5000 to 4200 BC, the Merimde culture, known only from a large settlement site at the edge of the Western Nile Delta, flourished in Lower Egypt. The culture has strong connections to the Faiyum A culture as well as the Levant. People lived in small huts, produced simple undecorated pottery, and had stone tools. Cattle, sheep, goats, and pigs were raised, and wheat, sorghum and barley were planted. The Merimde people buried their dead within the settlement and produced clay figurines. The first Egyptian life-size head made of clay comes from Merimde.

=== Badarian culture (4400–4000 BC) ===
The Badarian culture, from about 4400 to 4000 BC, is named for the Badari site near Der Tasa. It followed the Tasian culture (c. 4500 BC) but was so similar that many consider them one continuous period. The Badarian culture continued to produce blacktop-ware pottery (albeit much improved in quality) and was assigned sequence dating (SD) numbers 21–29. The primary difference that prevents scholars from merging the two periods is that Badarian sites use copper in addition to stone and are thus chalcolithic settlements, while the Neolithic Tasian sites are still considered Stone Age.

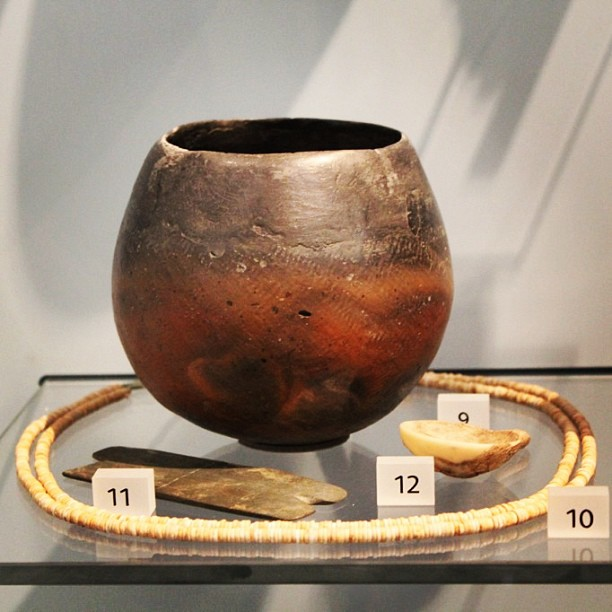
A Badarian burial. 4500–3850 BC

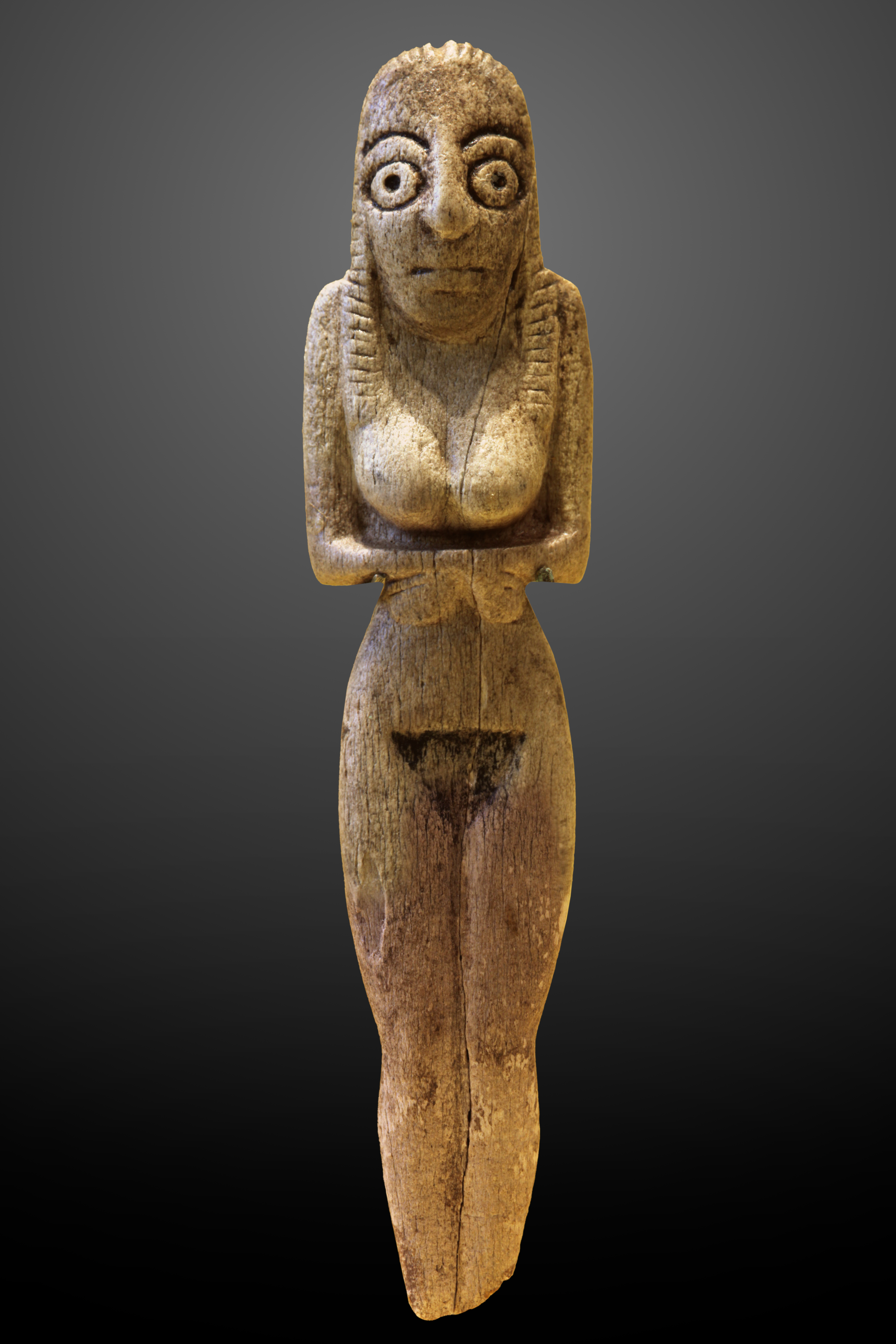
Mortuary figurine of a woman; 4400–4000 BC; crocodile bone; height: 8.7 cm; Louvre

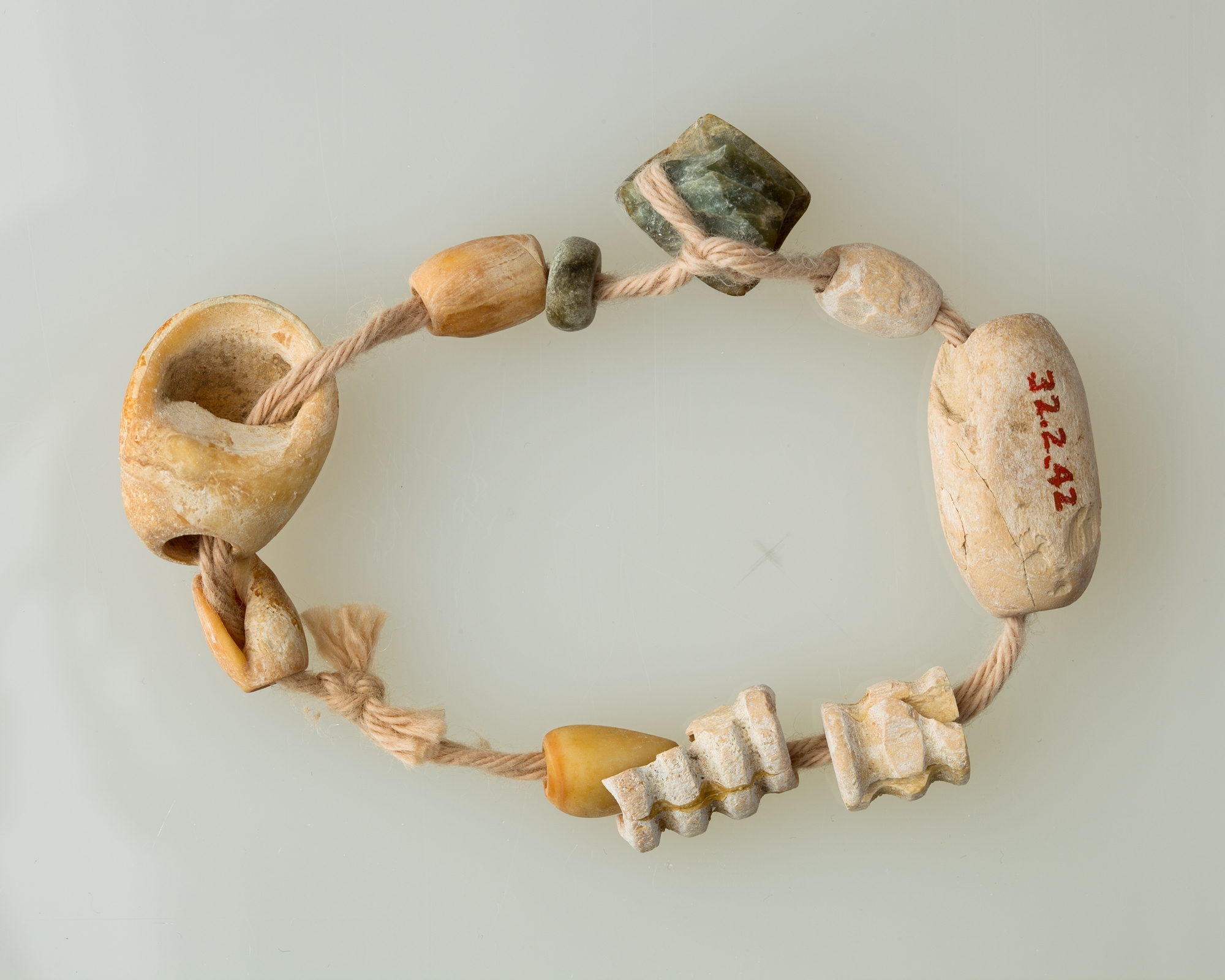
String of beads; 4400–3800 BC; the beads are made of bone, serpentinite and shell; length: 15 cm; Metropolitan Museum of Art

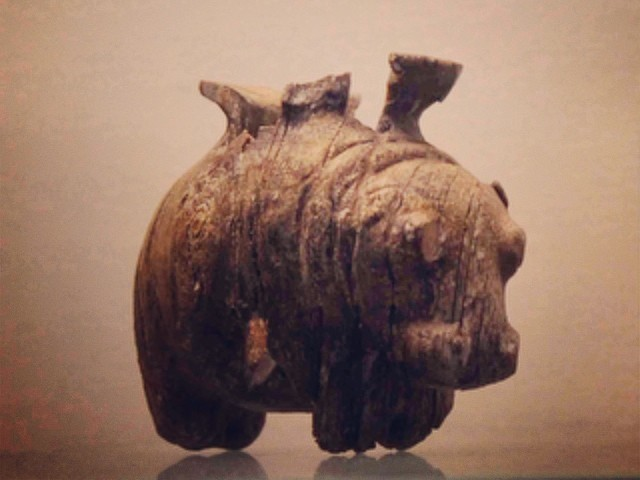
Vase in the shape of a hippopotamus. Early Predynastic, Badarian. 5th millennium BC

=== Naqada culture (4000–3000 BC) ===
The Naqada culture is an archaeological culture of Chalcolithic Predynastic Egypt (c. 4400–3000 BC), named for the town of Naqada, Qena Governorate. It is divided into three sub-periods: Naqada I, II and III.

==== Naqada I ====
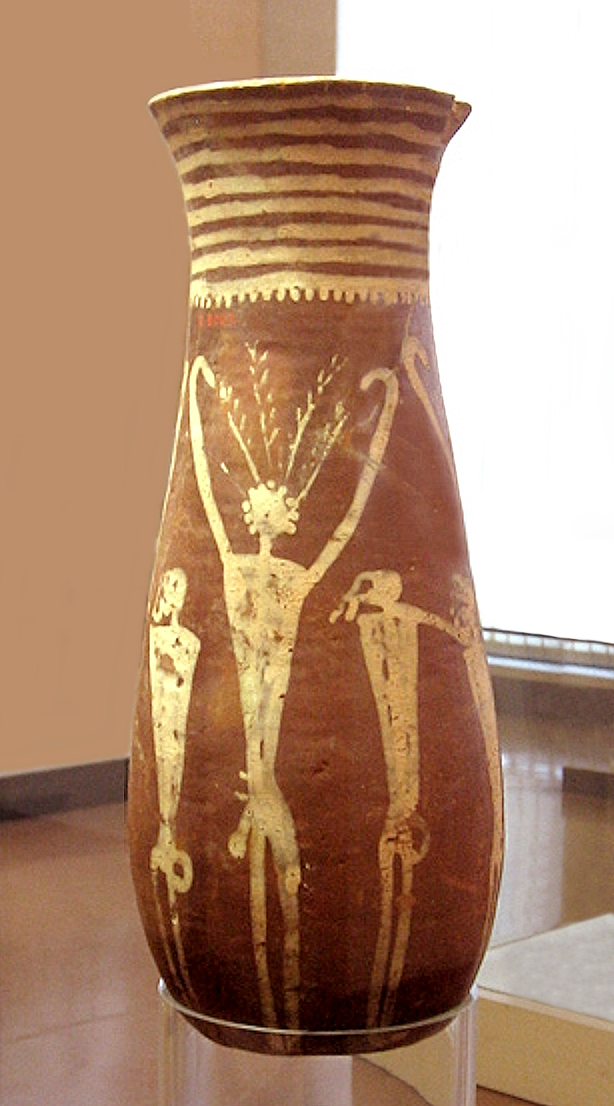
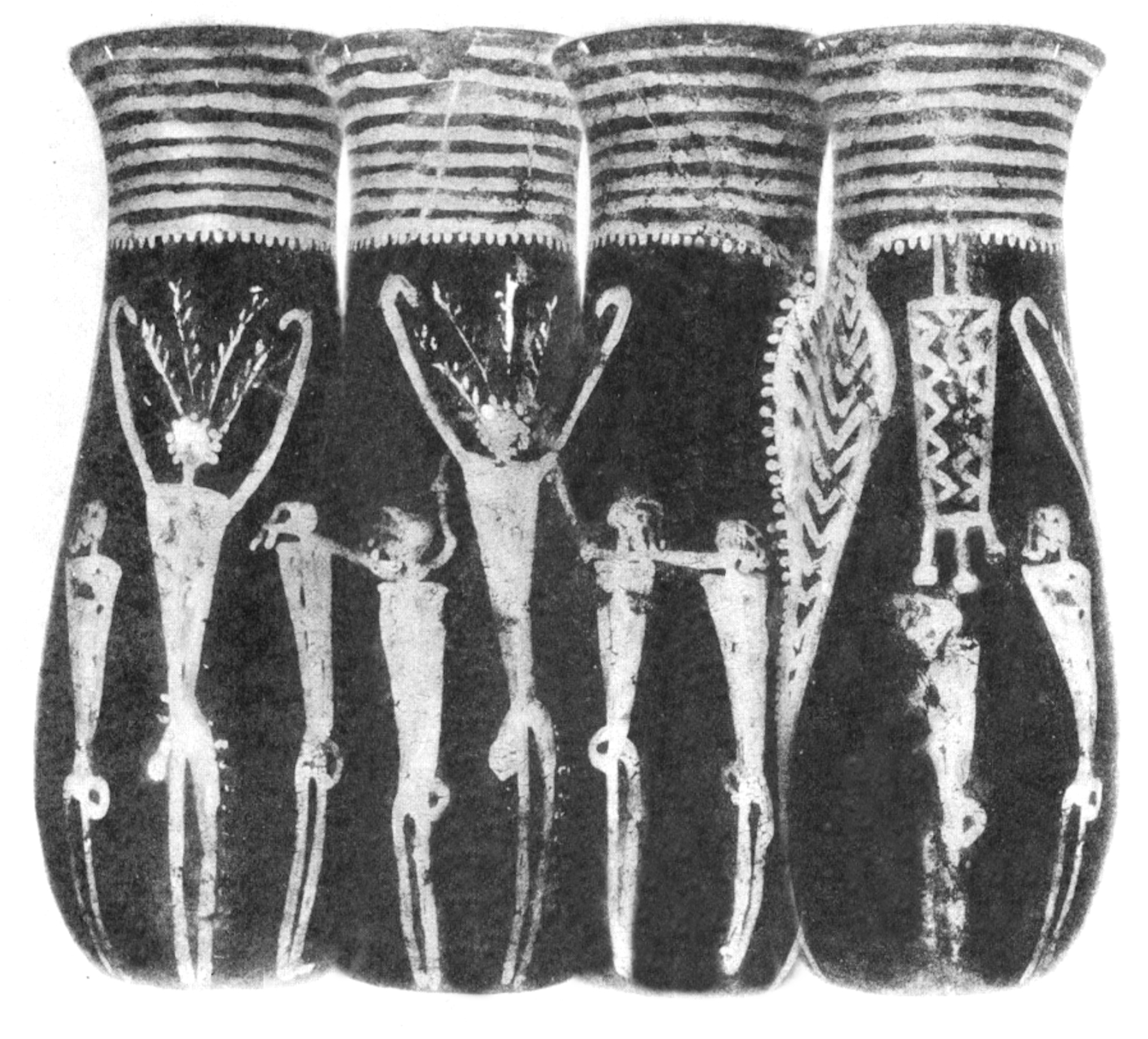
Vase with victorious human figure, and smaller individuals attached with a rope at the neck. Naqada IC-IIA (c. 3800-3600 BC). Royal Museums of Art and History, E3002.

The Naqada I (Amratian) culture lasted from about 4000 to 3500 BC. Black-topped ware continues to appear, but white cross-line ware – a type of pottery which has been decorated with crossing sets of close parallel white lines – is also found at this time. The Amratian period falls between 30 and 39 SD.

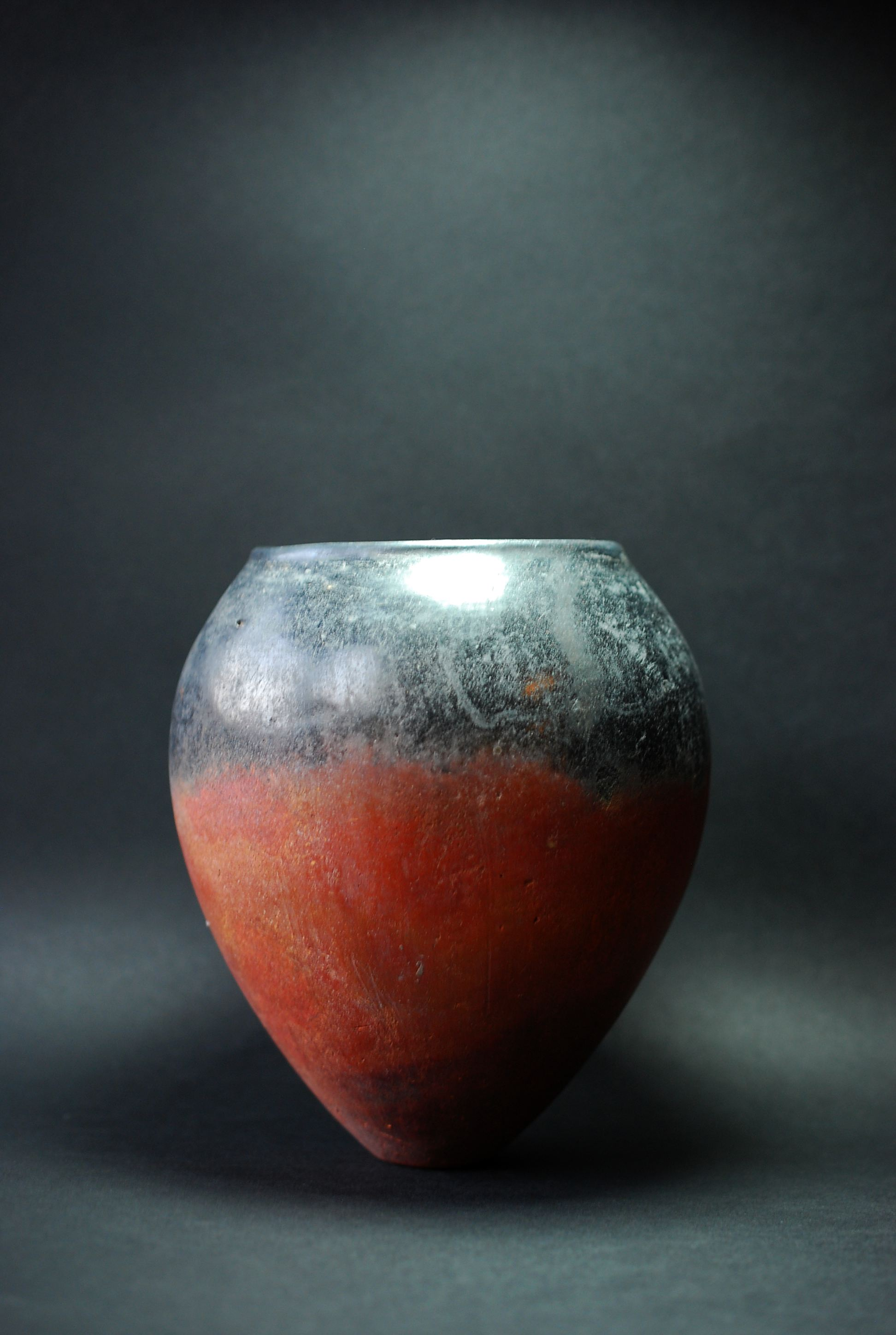
Ovoid Naqada I (Amratian) black-topped terracotta vase, (c. 3800–3500 BC)

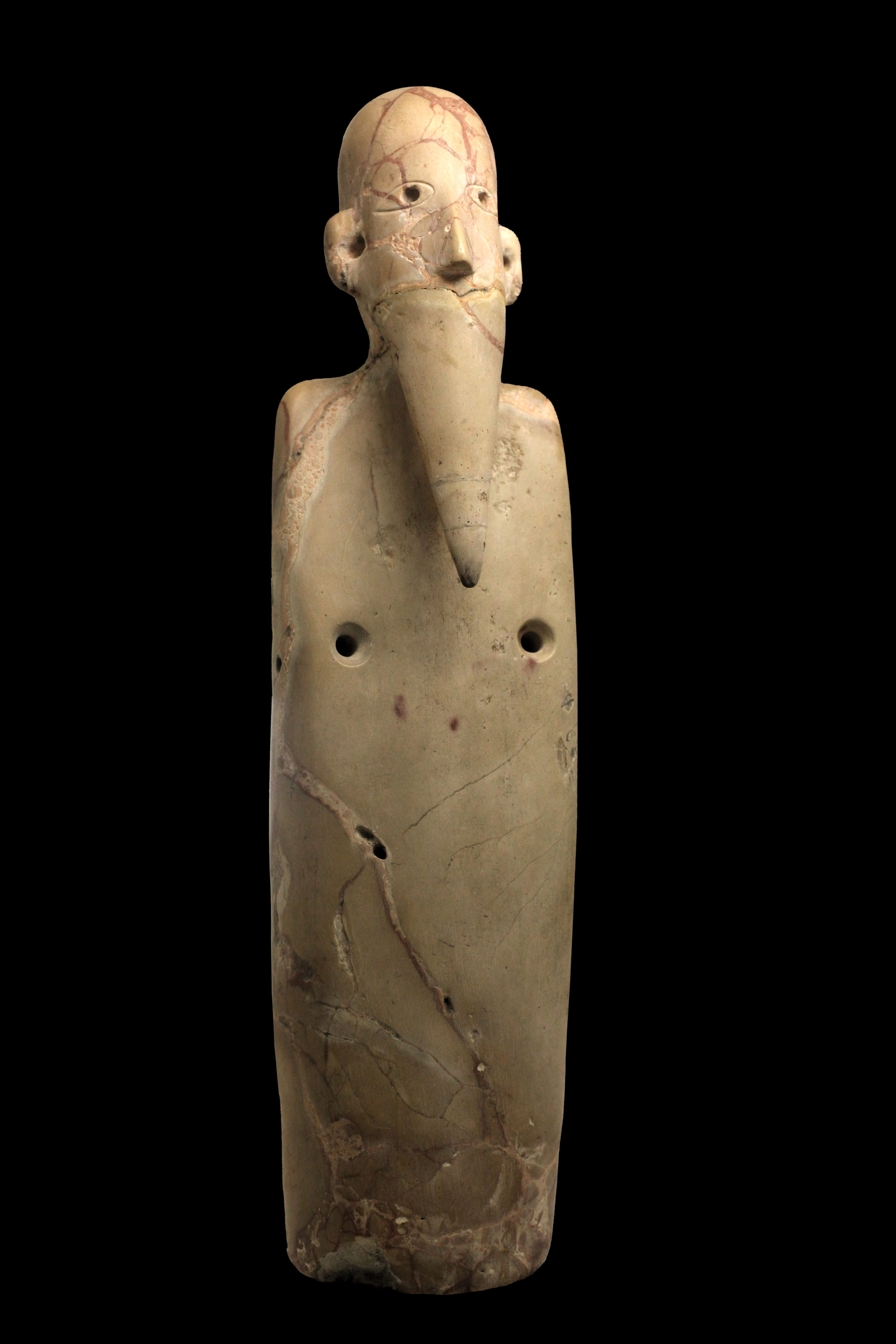
Figurine of a bearded man; 3800–3500 BC; breccia; from Upper Egypt; Musée des Confluences (Lyon, France)

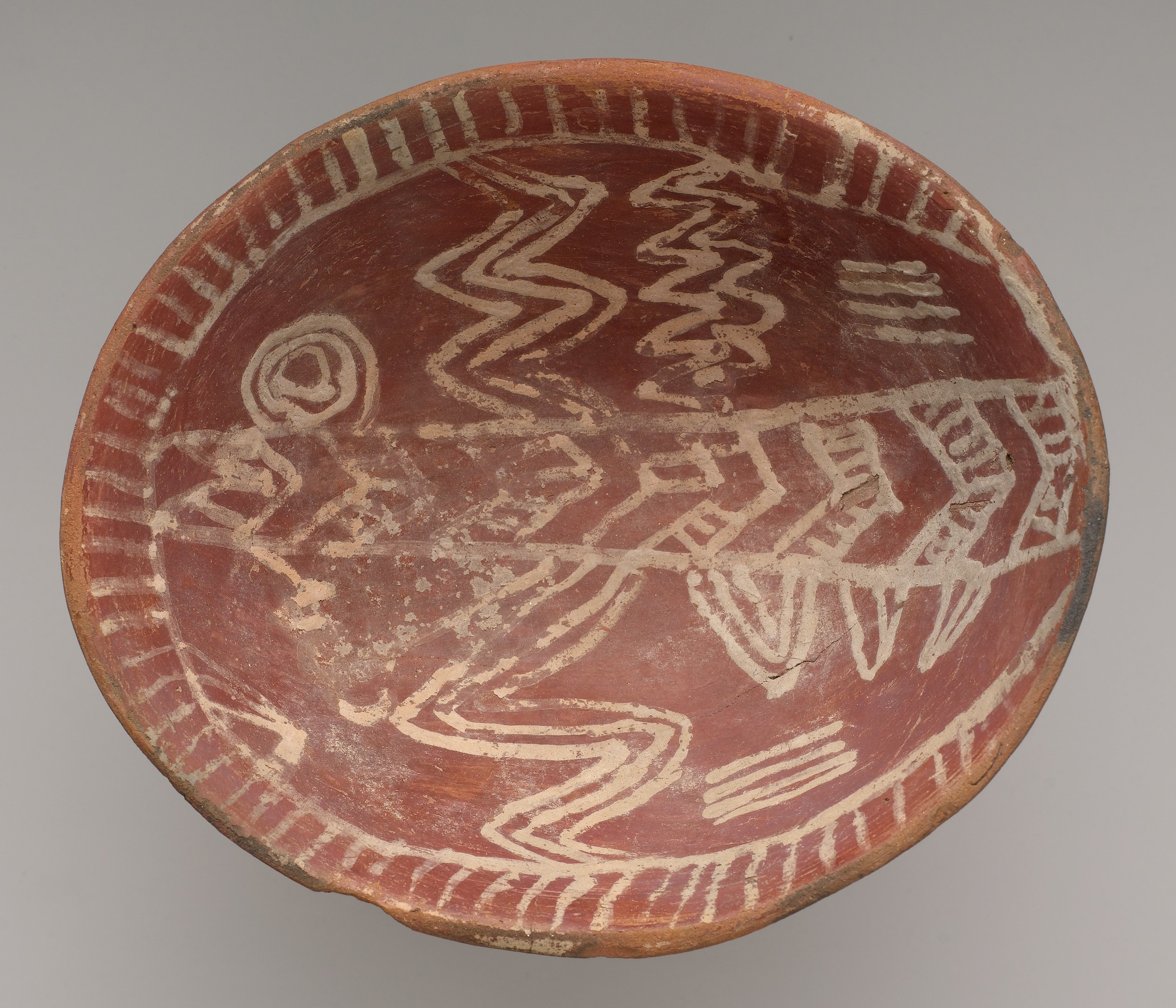
White cross-lined bowl with four legs; 3700–3500 BC; painted pottery; height: 15.6 cm, diameter: 19.7 cm; Metropolitan Museum of Art

==== Naqada II ====
The Gebel el-Arak Knife (3200 BC)

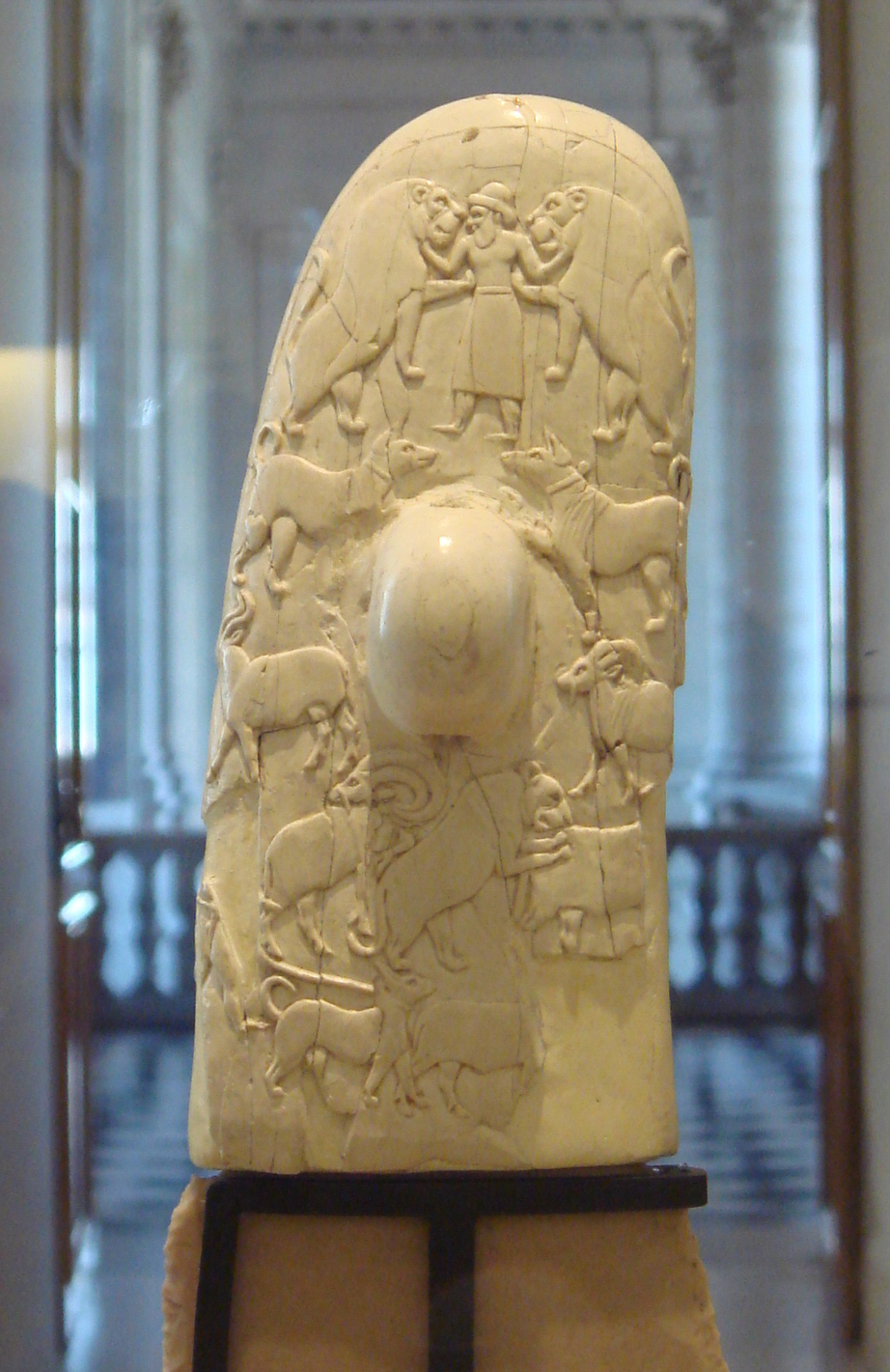
Egyptian prehistoric Gebel el-Arak Knife ivory handle (back), Abydos, Egypt. Louvre Museum.

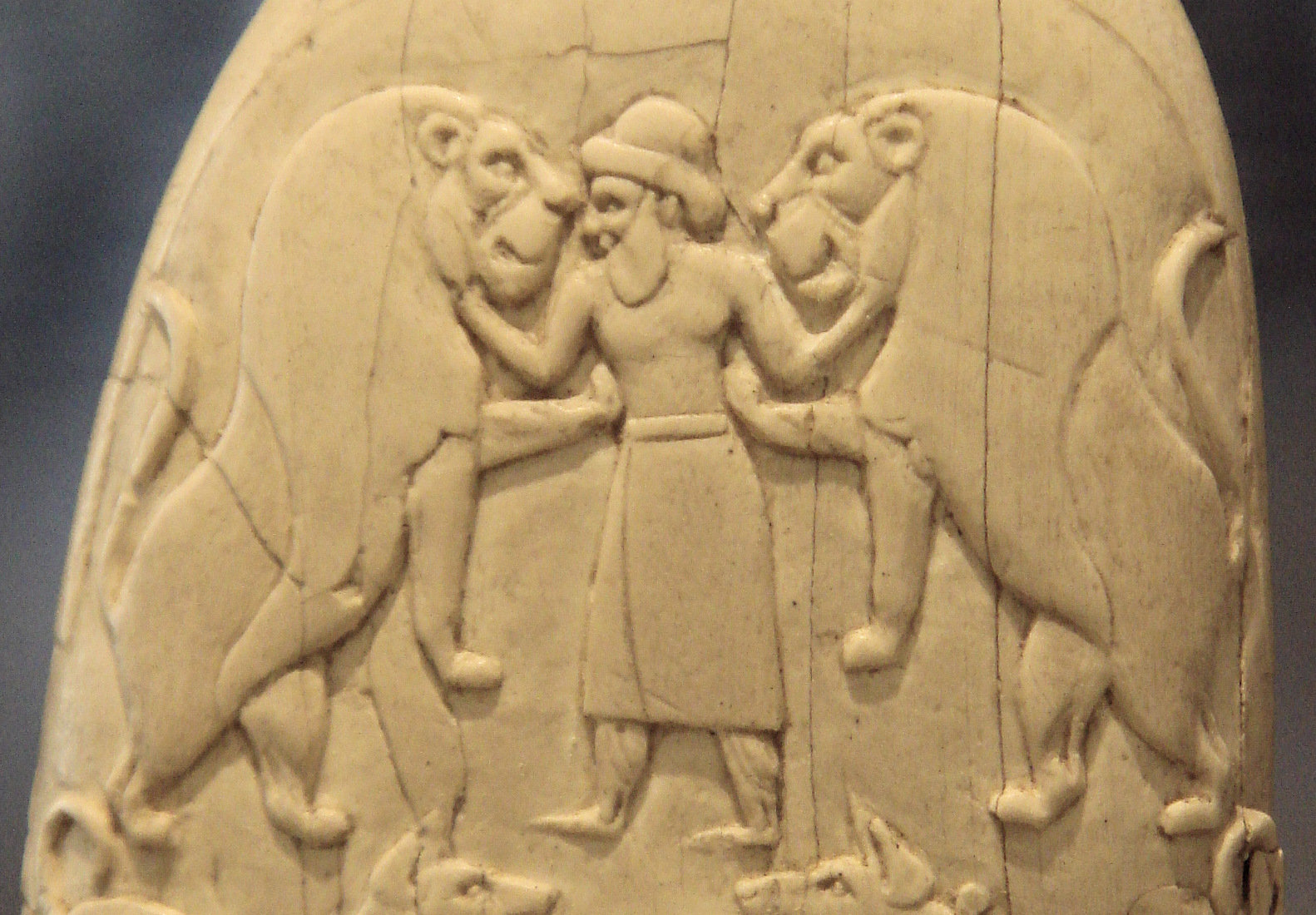
Mesopotamian king as Master of Animals on the Gebel el-Arak Knife. This work of art both shows the influence of Mesopotamia on Egypt at an early date, during a period of Egypt–Mesopotamia relations, and the state of Mesopotamian royal iconography during the Uruk period.

The Naqada II (Gerzean) culture from about 3500 to 3200 BC, is named after the site of Gerzeh. It was the next stage in Egyptian cultural development, and it was during this time that the foundation of Dynastic Egypt was laid. Naqada II culture is largely an unbroken development of Naqada I, expanding from the Upper Nile region towards the Nile delta and towards Nubia. Naqada II pottery has been assigned SD values of 40 through 62, and is distinctly different from Naqada I white cross-lined wares or black-topped ware. It was painted mostly in dark red with pictures of animals, people, and ships, as well as geometric symbols that appear to have been derived from animals. Wavy handles, which were rare before this period (though occasionally found as early as SD 35), became more common and more elaborate until they were almost completely ornamental.

During this period, distinctly foreign objects and art forms entered Egypt, indicating contact with several parts of Asia, particularly with Mesopotamia. Objects such as the Gebel el-Arak Knife handle, which has patently Mesopotamian relief carvings on it, have been found in Egypt, and the silver which appears in this period can only have been obtained from Asia Minor. In addition, Egyptian objects were created which clearly mimic Mesopotamian forms. Cylinder seals appeared in Egypt, as well as recessed paneling architecture. The Egyptian reliefs on cosmetic palettes were made in the same style as the contemporary Mesopotamian Uruk culture, and ceremonial mace heads from the late Gerzean and early Semainean were crafted in the Mesopotamian "pear-shaped" style, instead of the Egyptian native style.

The route of this trade is difficult to determine, but contact with Canaan does not predate the early dynastic, so it is usually assumed to have been by water. During the time when the Dynastic Race Theory was popular, it was theorized that Uruk sailors circumnavigated Arabia, but a Mediterranean route, probably by middlemen through Byblos, is more likely, as evidenced by the presence of Byblian objects in Egypt.

The fact that so many Naqada II sites are at the mouths of wadis which lead to the Red Sea may indicate some amount of trade via the Red Sea (though Byblian trade potentially could have crossed the Sinai and then taken to the Red Sea). Also, it is considered unlikely that something as complicated as recessed panel architecture could have worked its way into Egypt by proxy, and at least a small contingent of migrants is often suspected.

Despite this evidence of foreign influence, Egyptologists generally agree that the Naqada II Culture is predominantly indigenous to Egypt.

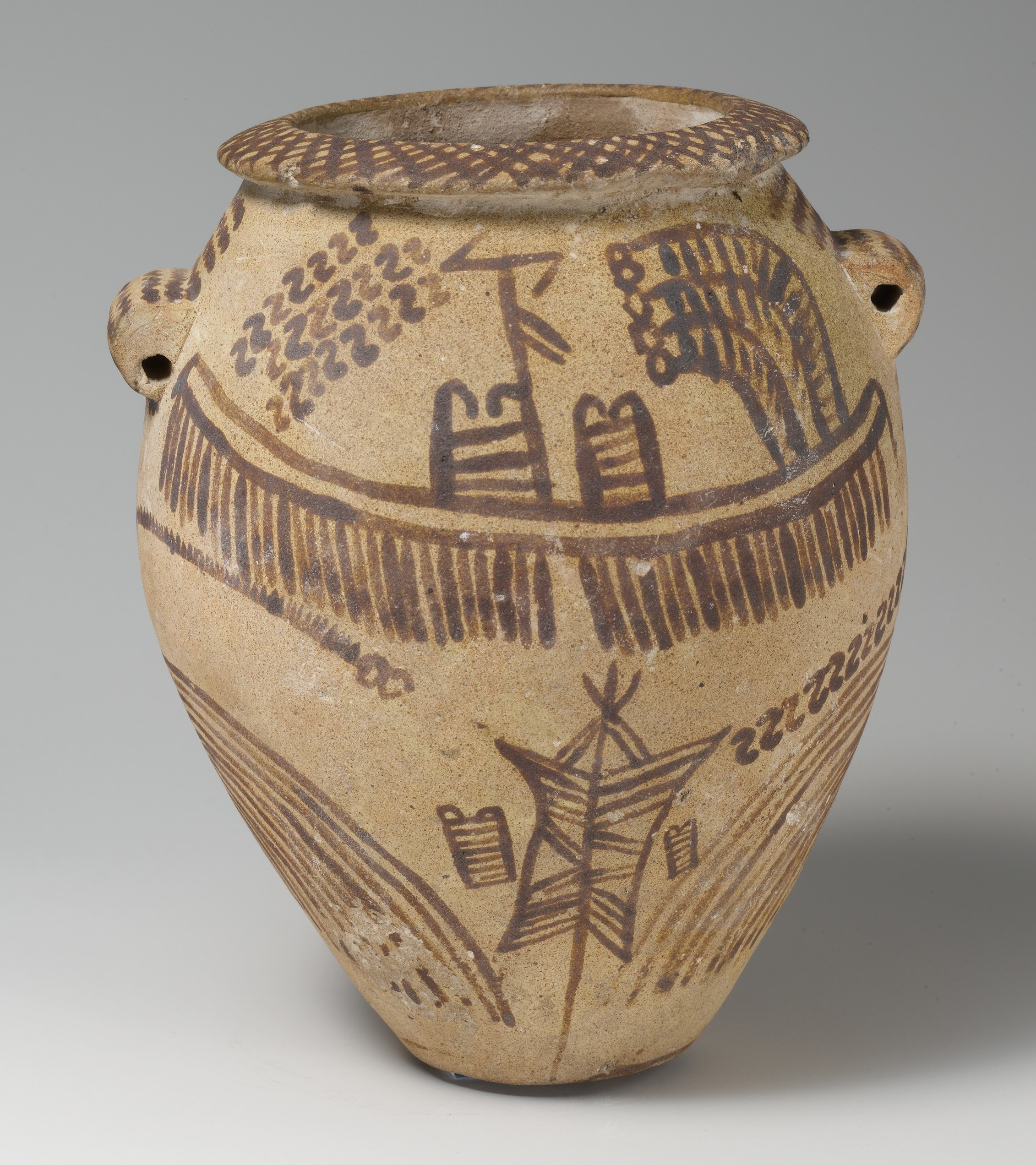
Decorated ware jar illustrating boats and trees; 3650–3500 BC; painted pottery; height: 16.2 cm, diameter: 12.9 cm; Metropolitan Museum of Art (New York City)

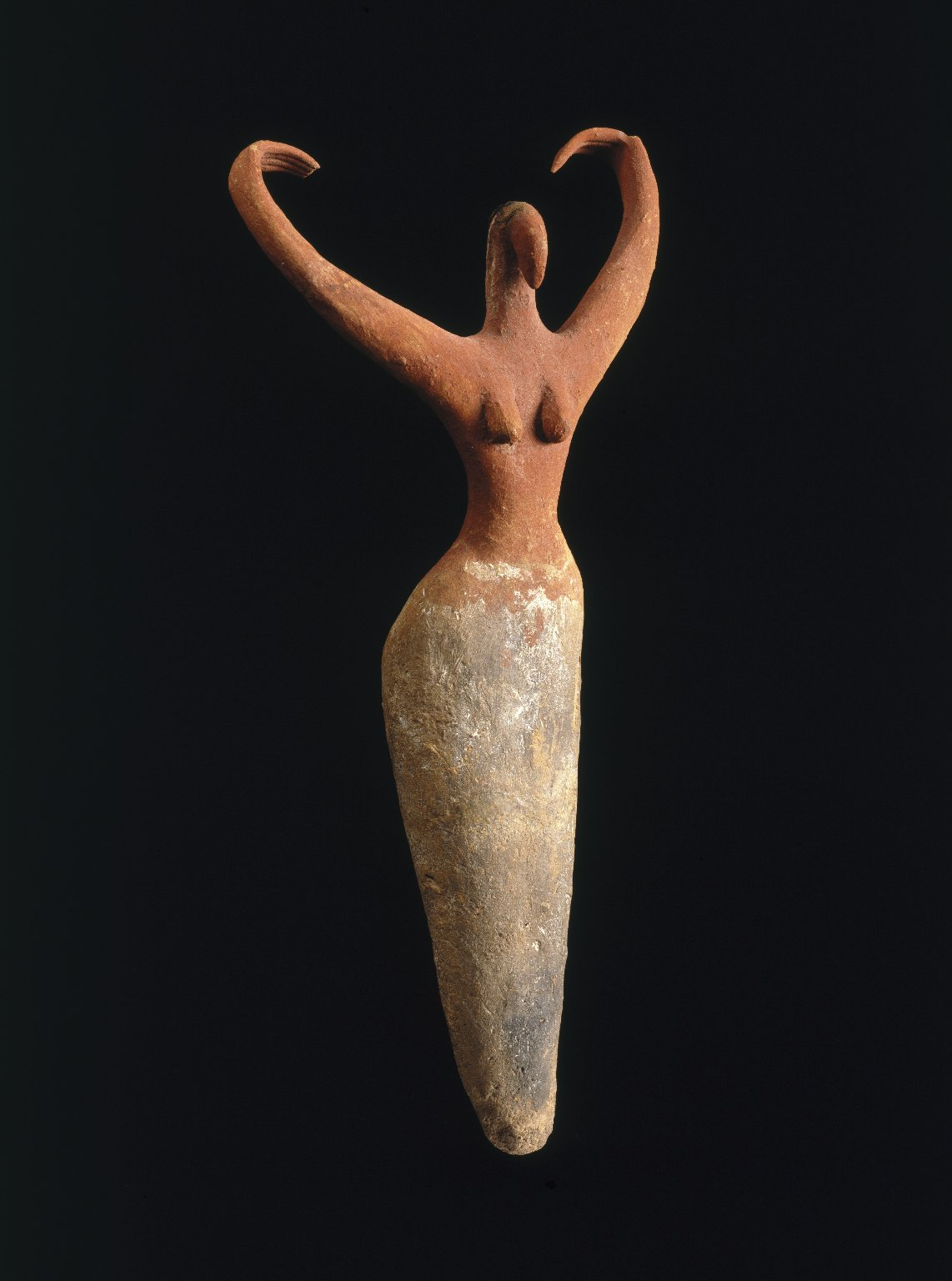
Female figure; c. 3600 BC; terracotta; 29.2 × 14 × 5.7 cm; from Ma'mariya (Egypt); Brooklyn Museum (New York City)

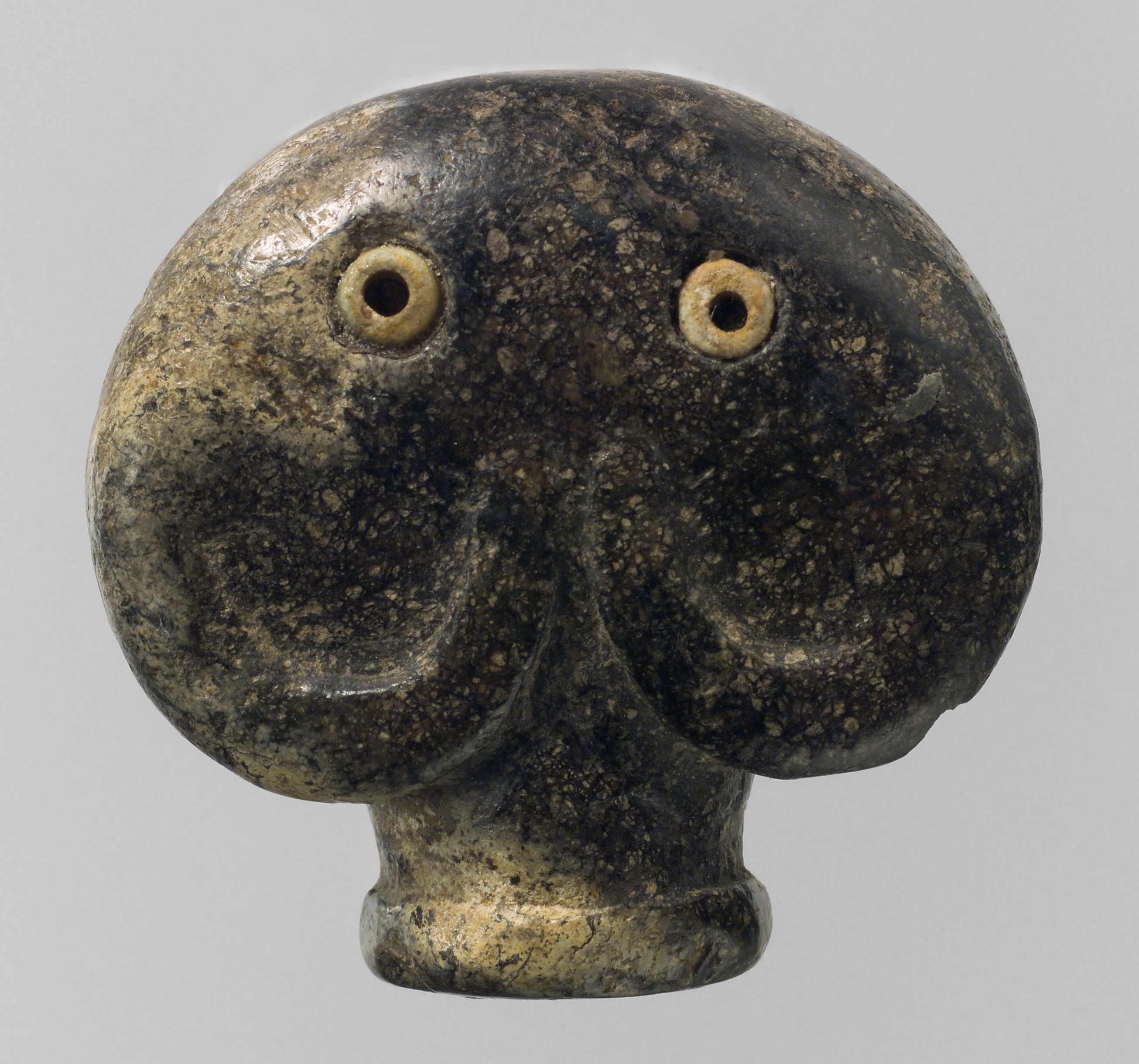
Amulet in the form of a head of an elephant; 3500–3300 BC; serpentine (the green part) and bone (the eyes); 3.5 × 3.6 × 2.1 cm; Metropolitan Museum of Art (New York City)

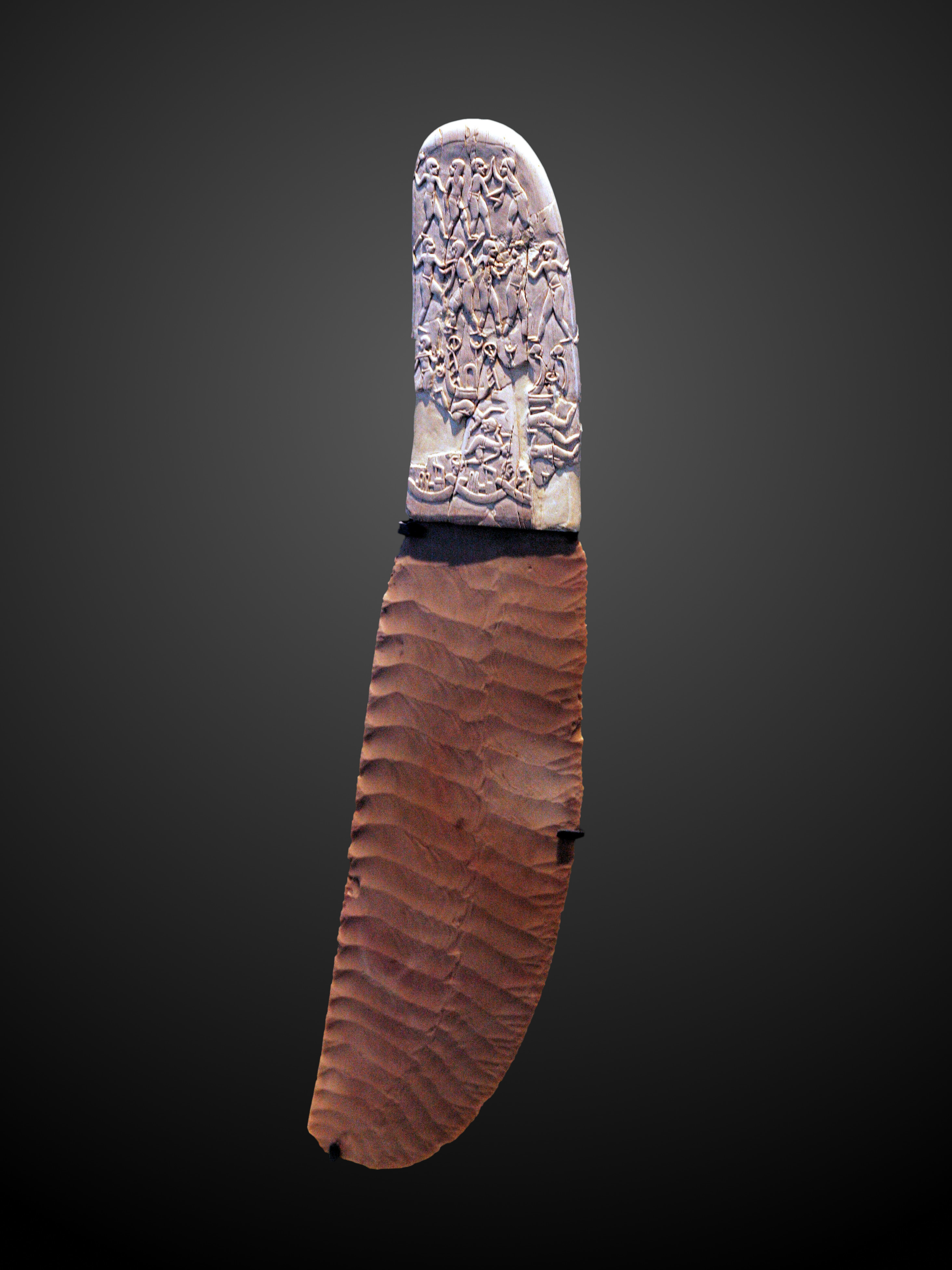
The Gebel el-Arak Knife; 3300–3200 BC; elephant ivory (the handle) and flint (the blade); length: 25.5 cm; most likely from Abydos (Egypt); Louvre

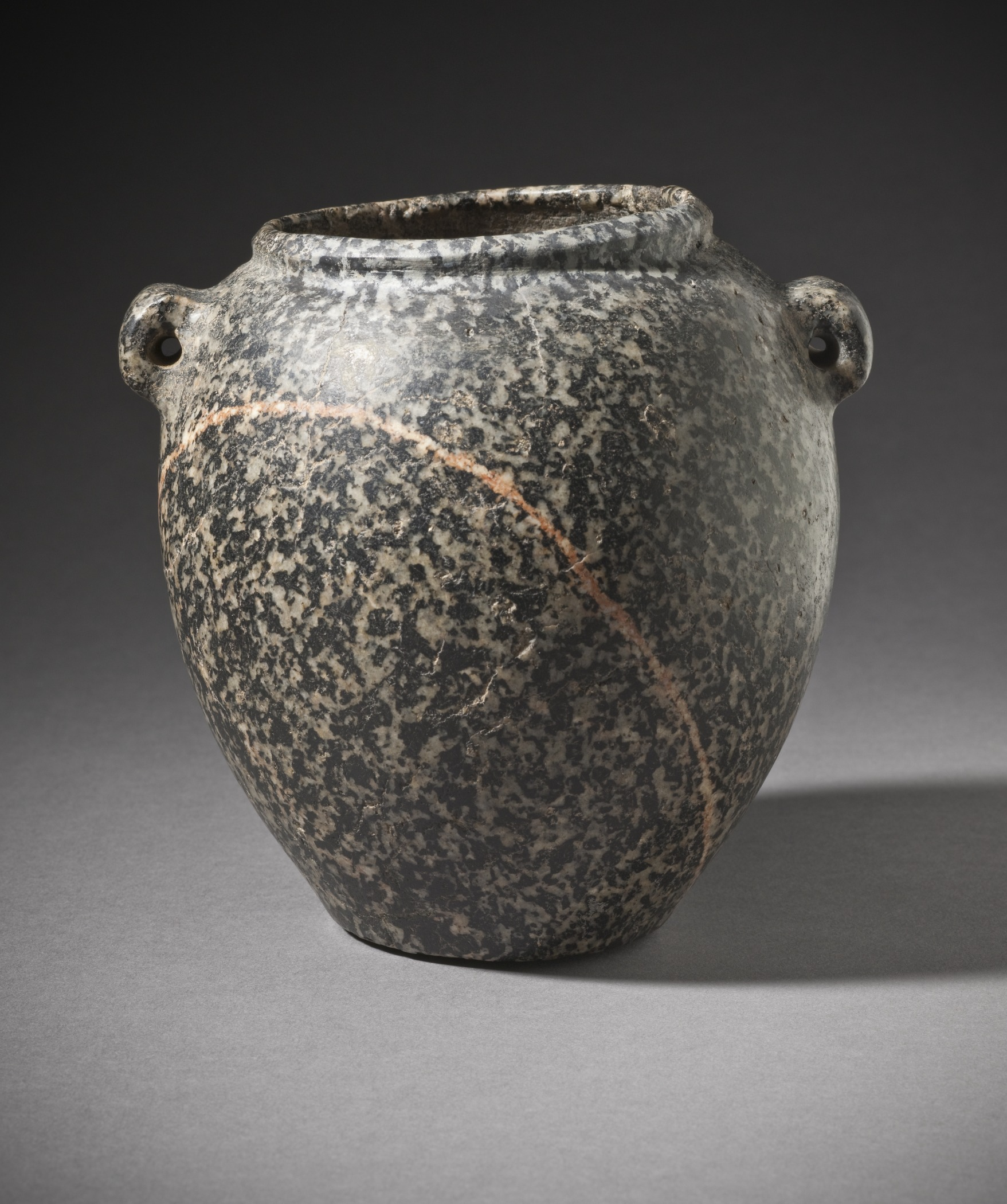
Jar with lug handles; c. 3500–3050 BC; diorite; height: 13 cm; Los Angeles County Museum of Art (US)

==== Protodynastic Period (Naqada III) ====
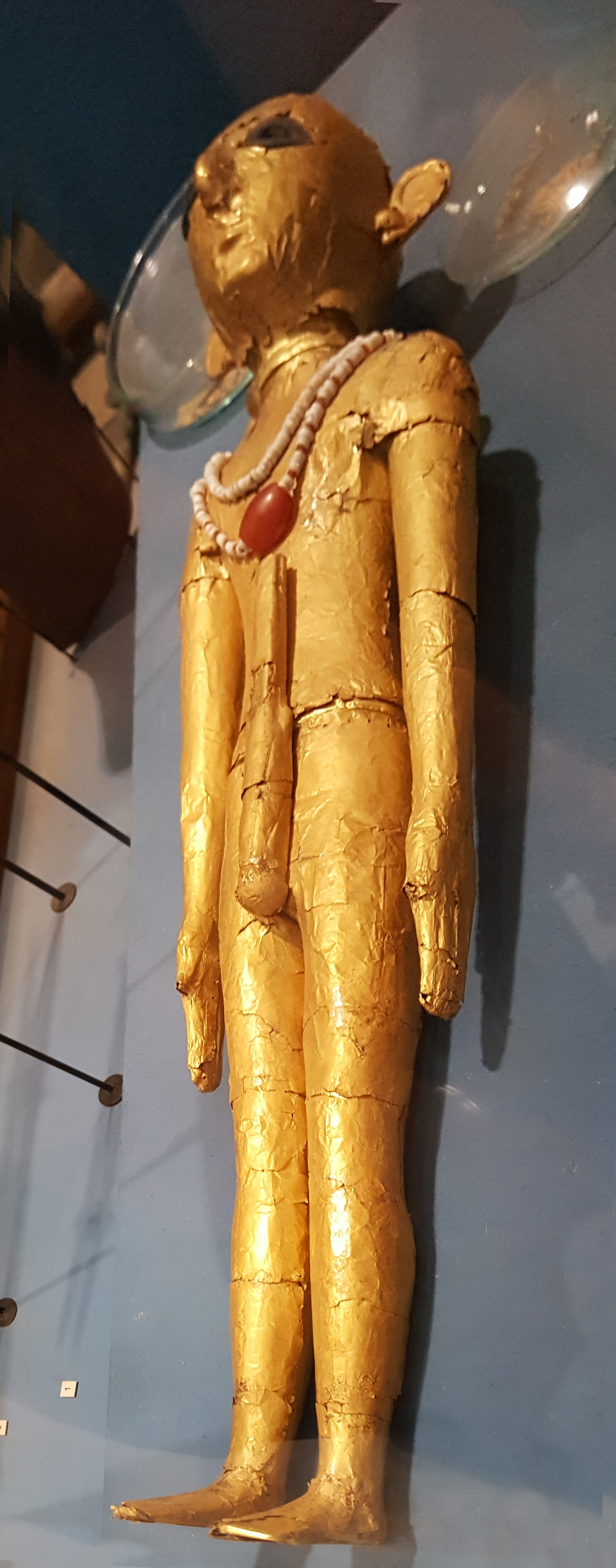
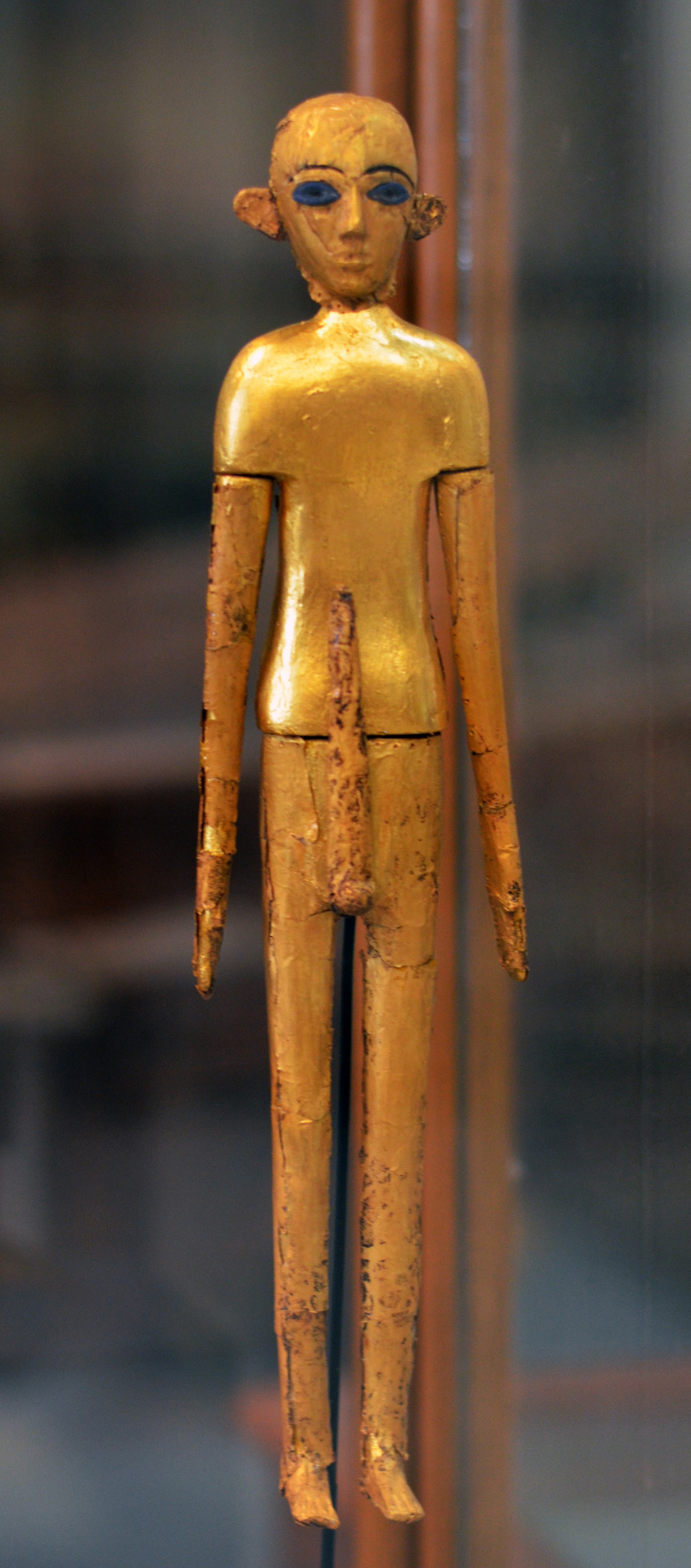
Oldest known representations of ancient Egyptian rulers, from Tell el-Farkha. Naqada IIIB, c. 3200–3000 BC.

The Naqada III period, from about 3200 to 3000 BC, is generally taken to be identical with the Protodynastic period, during which Egypt was unified.

Naqada III is notable for being the first era with hieroglyphs (though this is disputed), the first regular use of serekhs, the first irrigation, and the first appearance of royal cemeteries. The art of the Naqada III period was quite sophisticated, exemplified by cosmetic palettes. These were used in predynastic Egypt to grind and apply ingredients for facial or body cosmetics. By the Protodynastic period, the decorative palettes appear to have lost this function and were instead commemorative, ornamental, and possibly ceremonial. They were made almost exclusively from siltstone, which originated from quarries in the Wadi Hammamat. Many of the palettes were found at Hierakonpolis, a center of power in predynastic Upper Egypt. After the unification of the country, the palettes ceased to be included in tomb assemblages.

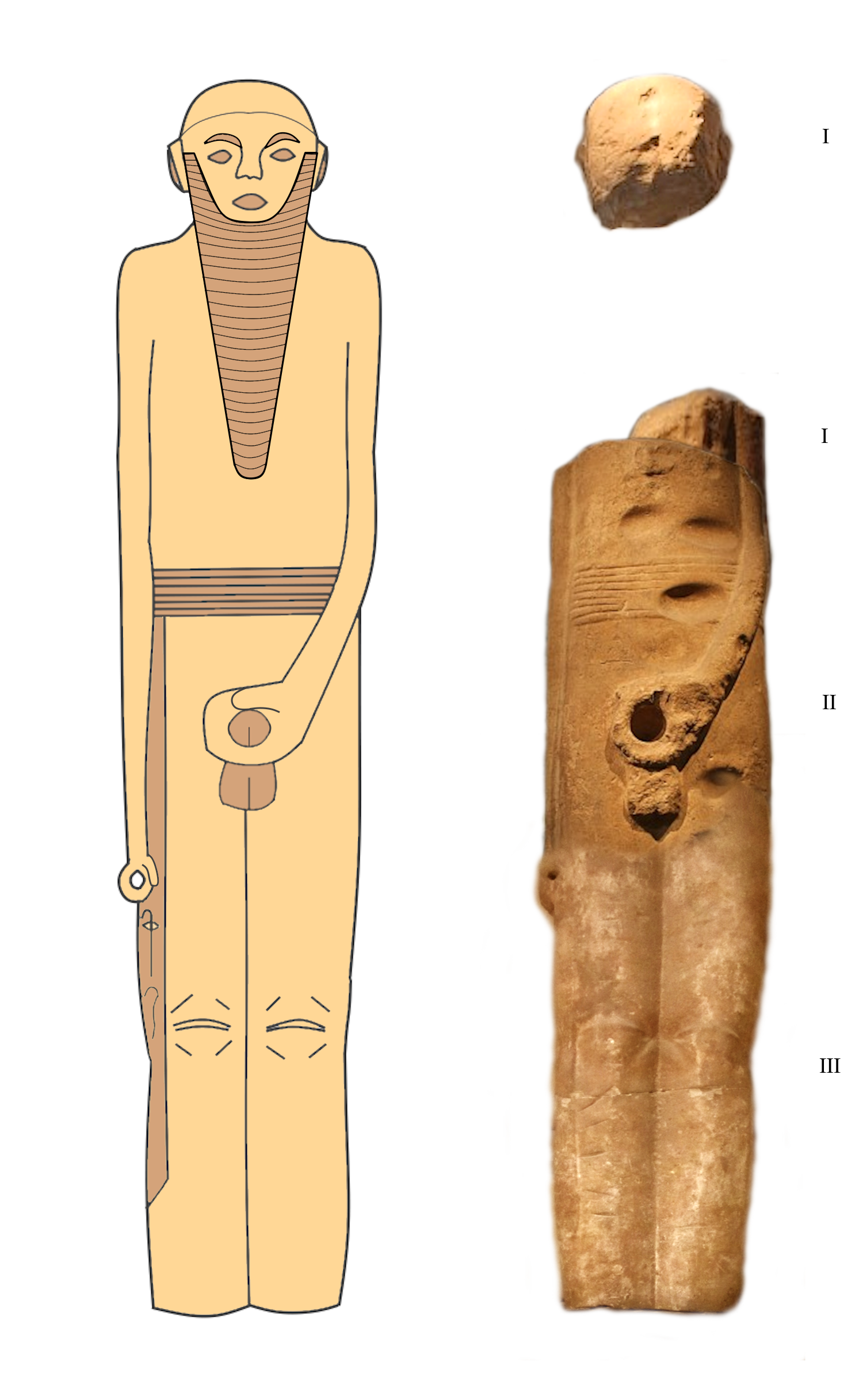
Reconstruction of the Koptos colossi, pre-dynastic colossal statues of the God Min, Koptos, about 3300 BCE.

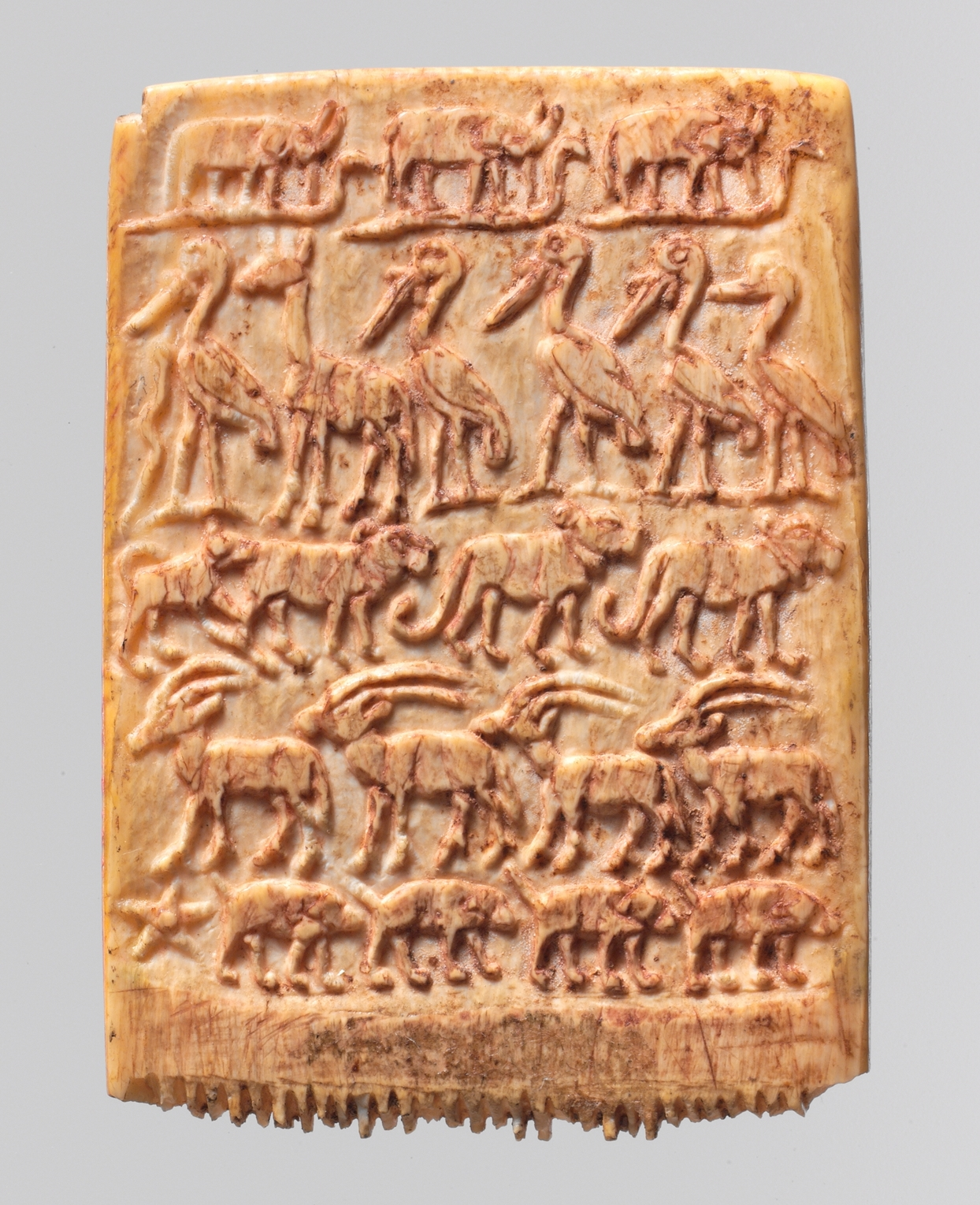
The Davis comb; 3200–3100 BC; ivory; 5.5 × 3.9 × 0.5 cm; Metropolitan Museum of Art

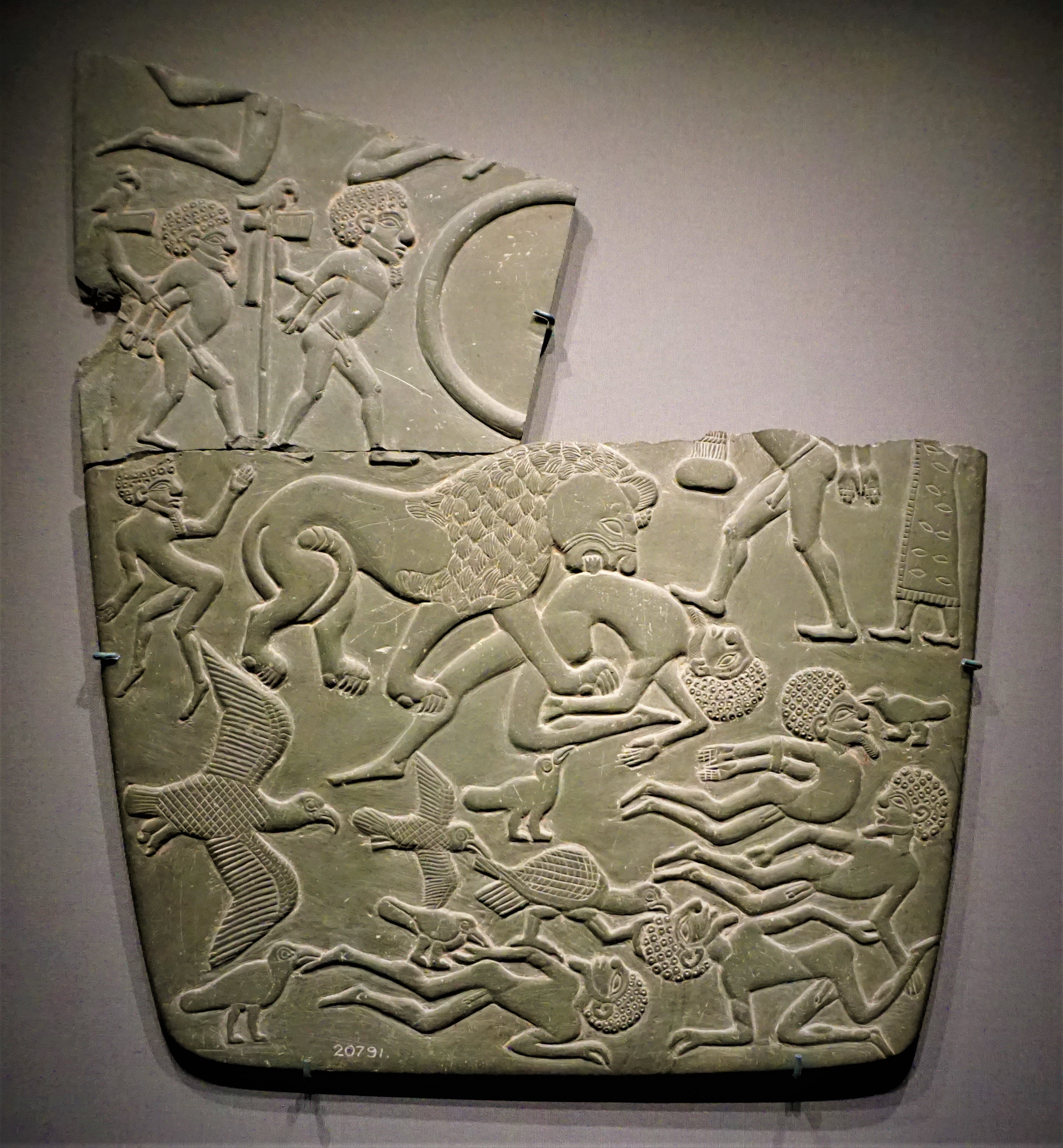
The Battlefield palette; 3100 BC; mudstone; width: 28.7 cm, depth: 1 cm; from Abydos (Egypt); British Museum (London)

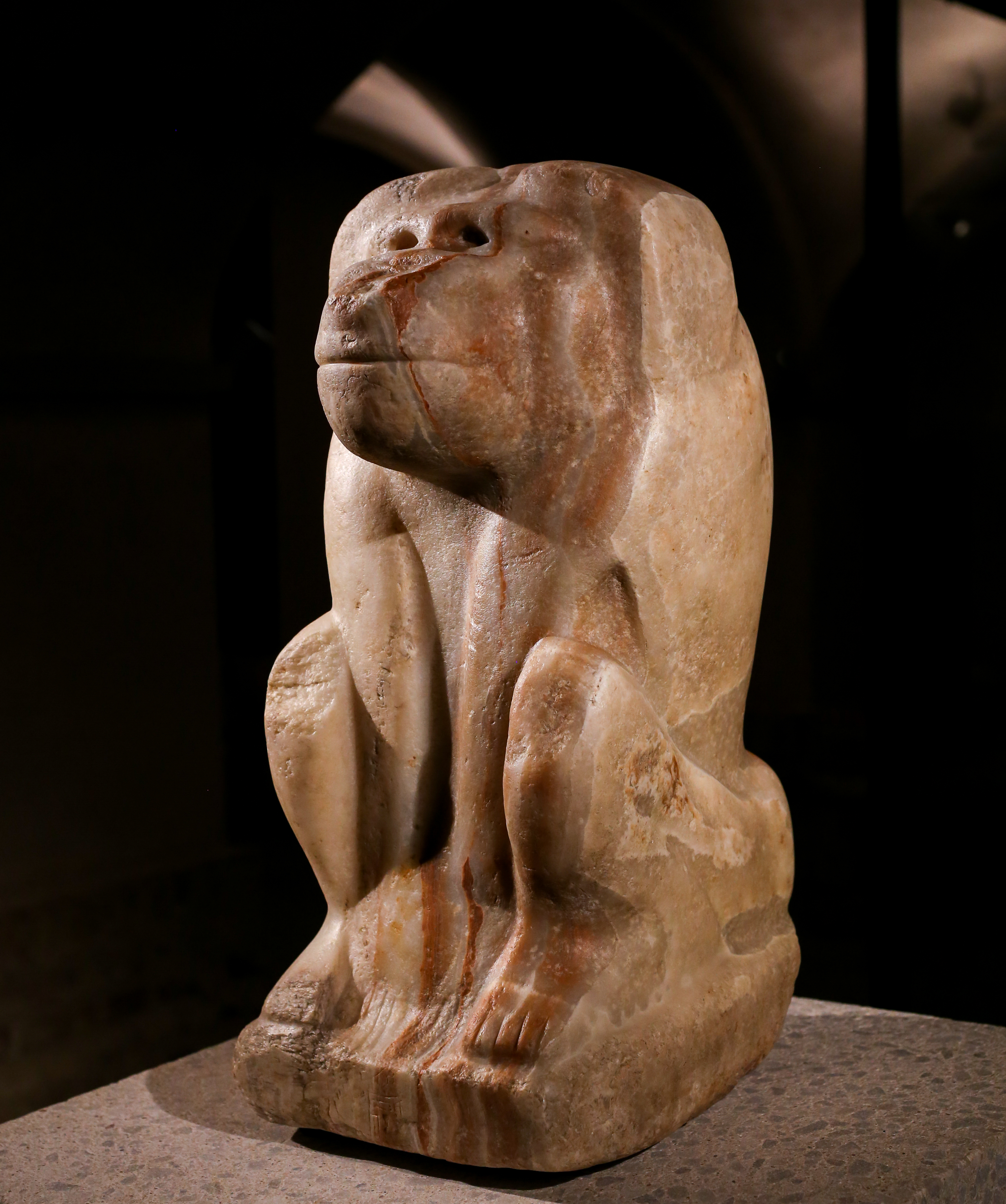
Baboon Divinity bearing the name of Pharaoh Narmer on its base; c. 3100 BC; calciteheight: 52 cm; Egyptian Museum of Berlin (Germany)

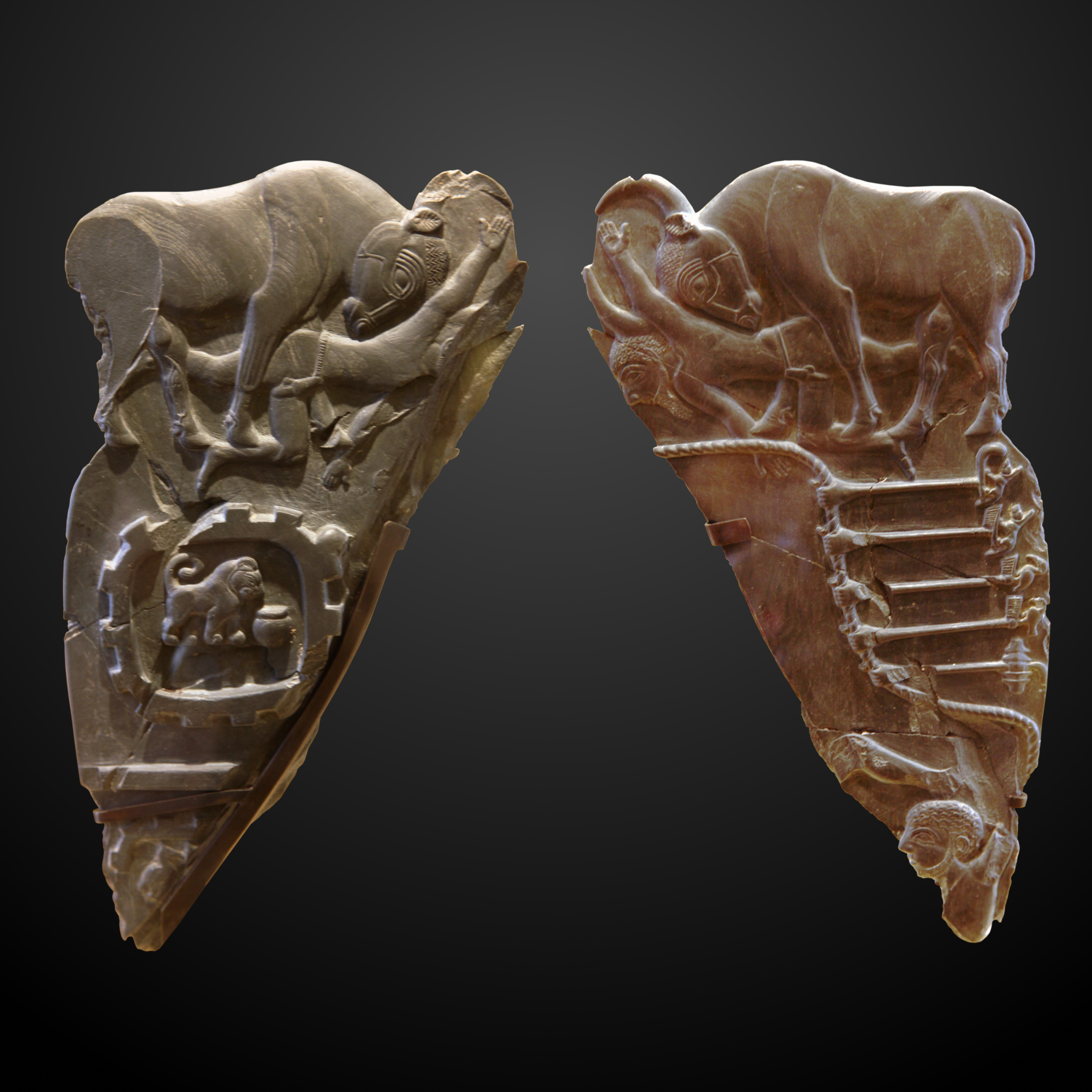
Both sides of the Bull palette; c. 3200–3000 BC; greywacke or schist; 25 cm; Louvre

== Art of Dynastic Egypt ==
=== C. IEarly Dynastic Period (3100–2685 BC) ===
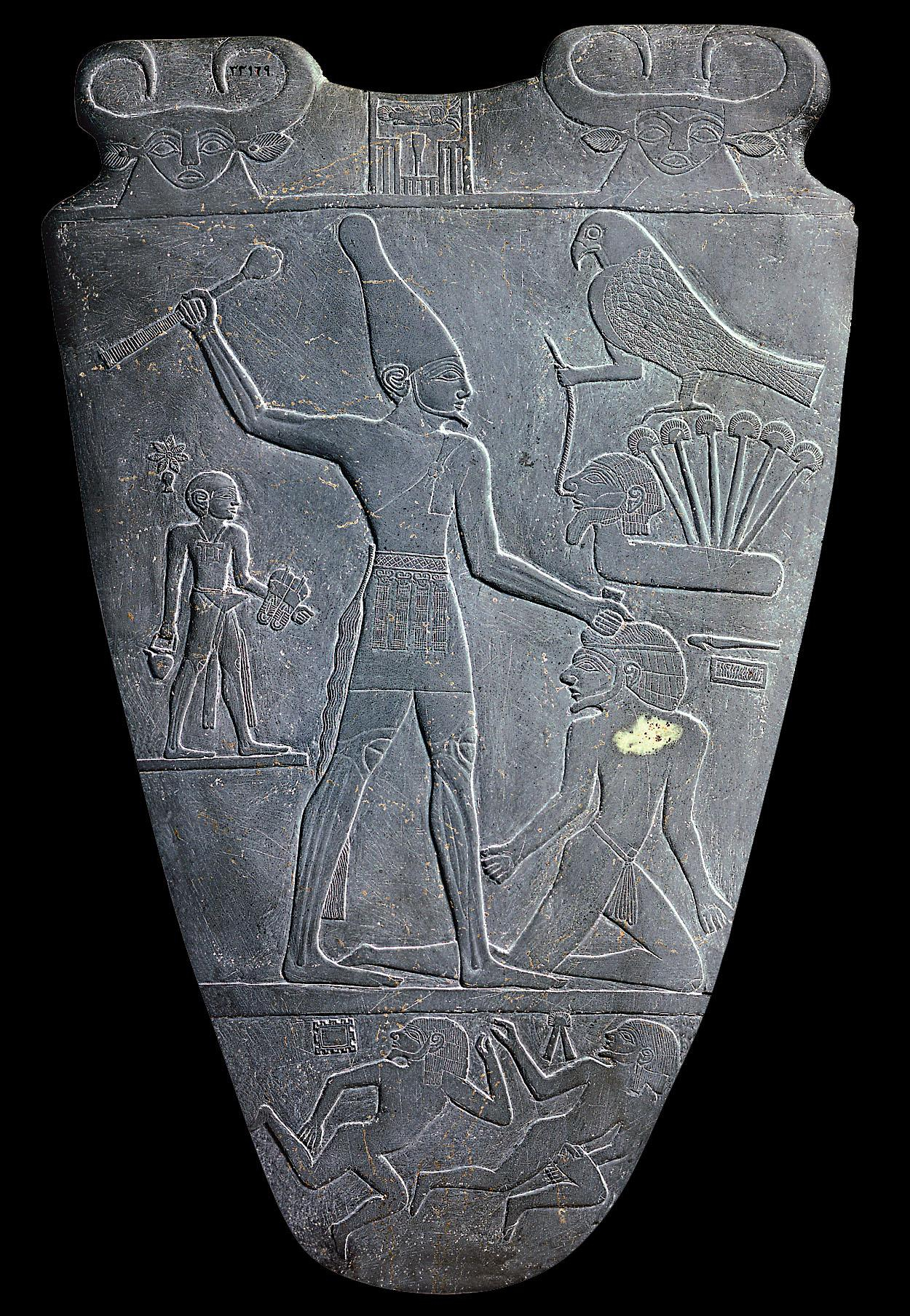
Narmer Palette

The Early Dynastic Period of Egypt immediately follows the unification of Upper and Lower Egypt, c. 3100 BC is generally taken to include the First and Second Dynasties, lasting from the end of the Naqada III archaeological period until about 2686 BC, or the beginning of the Old Kingdom.

Cosmetic palettes reached a new level of sophistication during this period, in which the Egyptian writing system also experienced further development. Initially, Egyptian writing was composed primarily of a few symbols denoting amounts of various substances Also known as hieroglyphic writing . In the cosmetic palettes, symbols were used together with pictorial descriptions. By the end of the Third Dynasty, this had been expanded to include more than 200 symbols, both phonograms and ideograms.

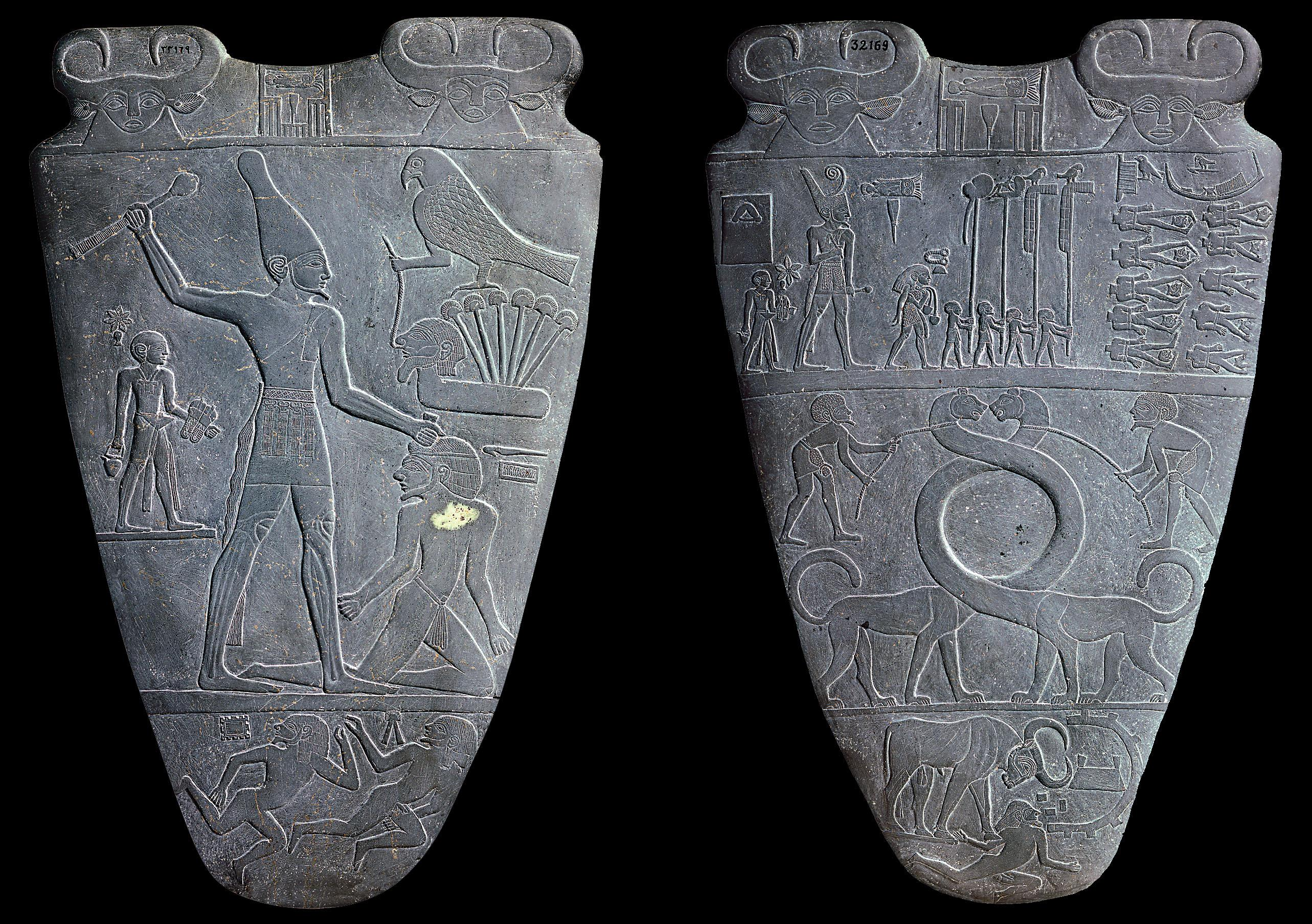
Both sides of the Narmer Palette; c. 3100 BC; greywacke; height: 63 cm; from Hierakonpolis (Egypt); Egyptian Museum (Cairo)

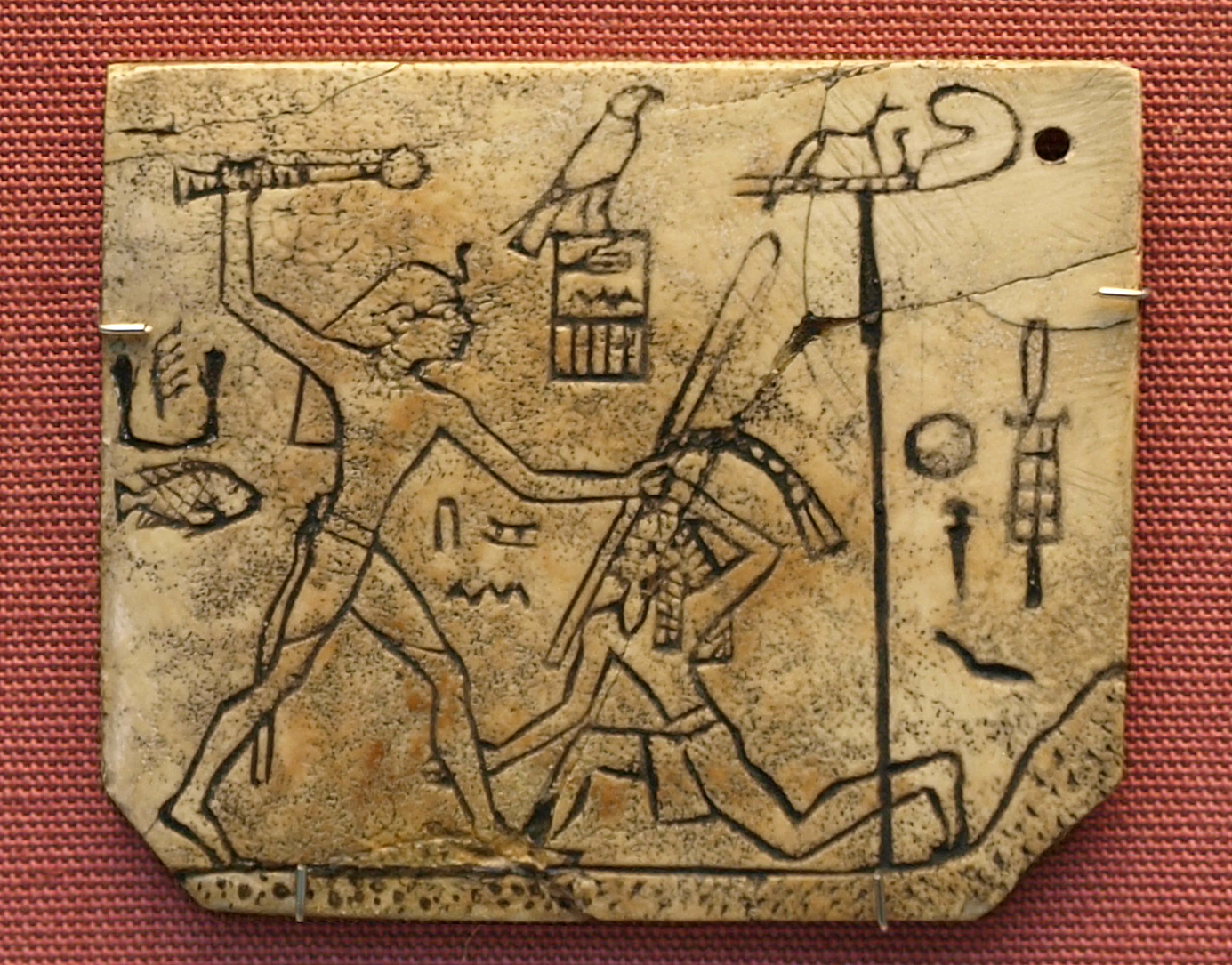
Tag depicting king Den; c. 3000 BC; ivory; 4.5 × 5.3 cm; from Abydos (Egypt); British Museum (London)

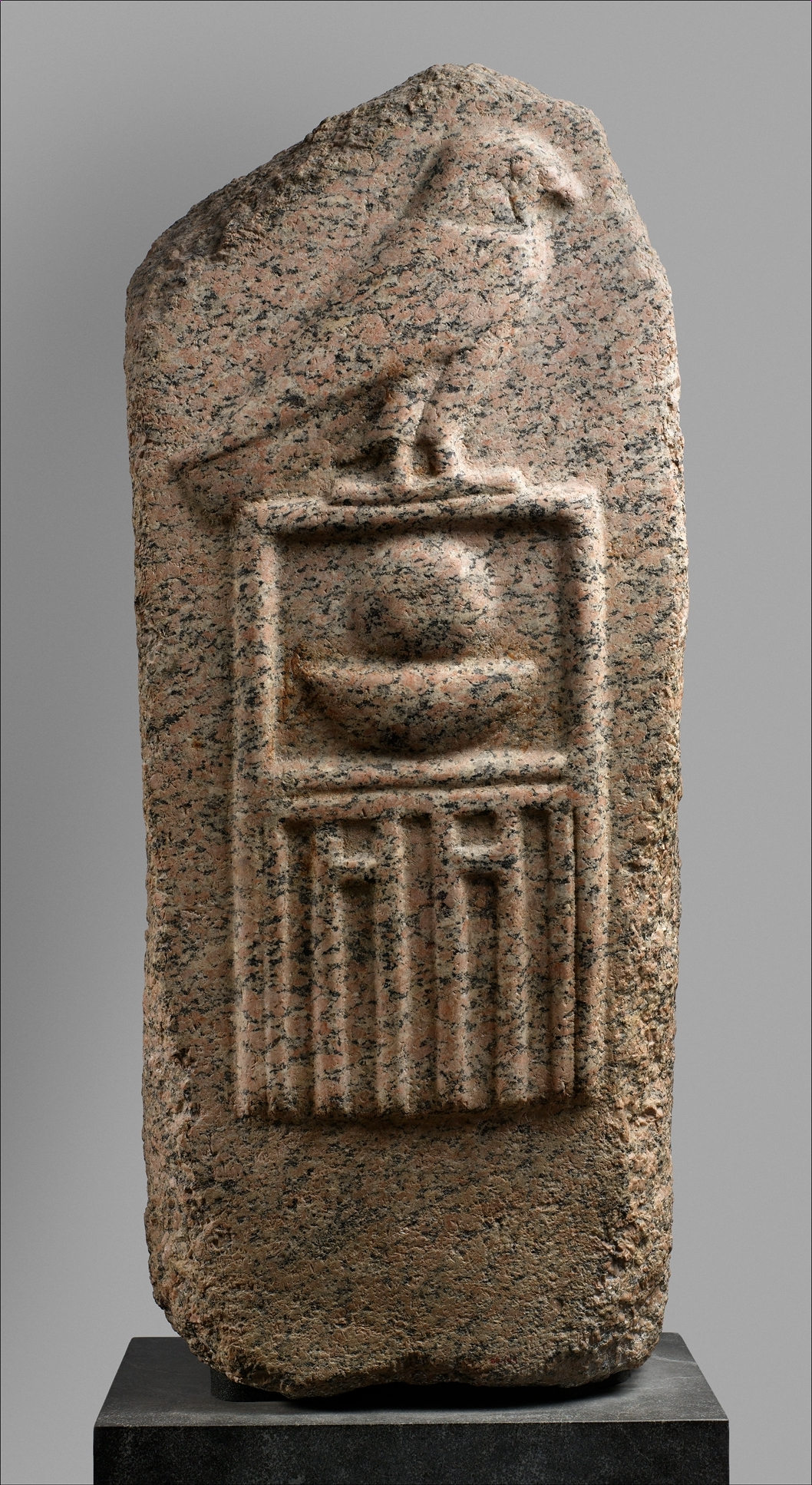
Stela of Raneb; c. 2880 BC; granite; height: 1 m, width: 41 cm; Metropolitan Museum of Art (New York City)

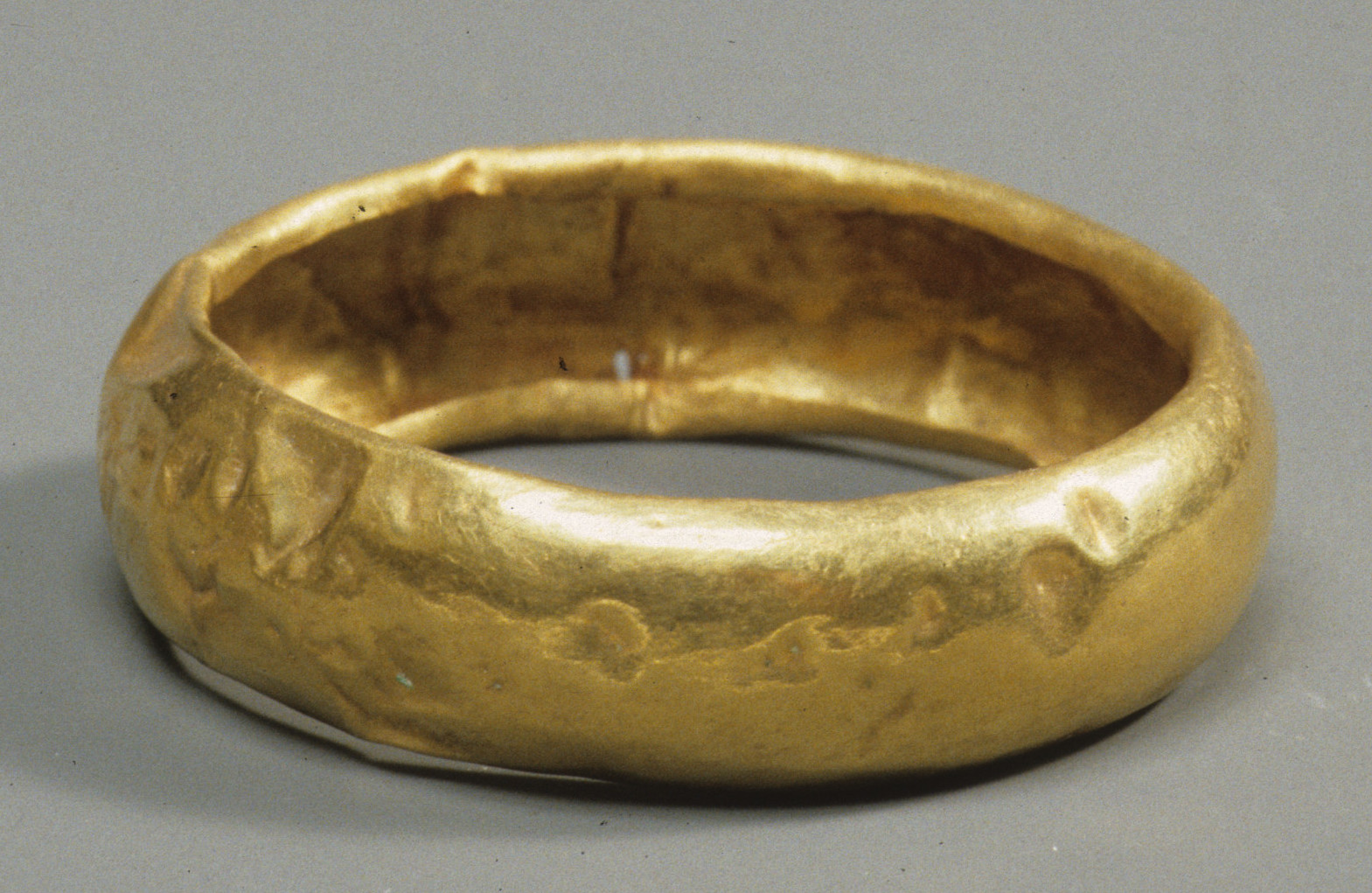
Bracelet; c. 2650 BC; gold; diameter: 6 cm; Metropolitan Museum of Art

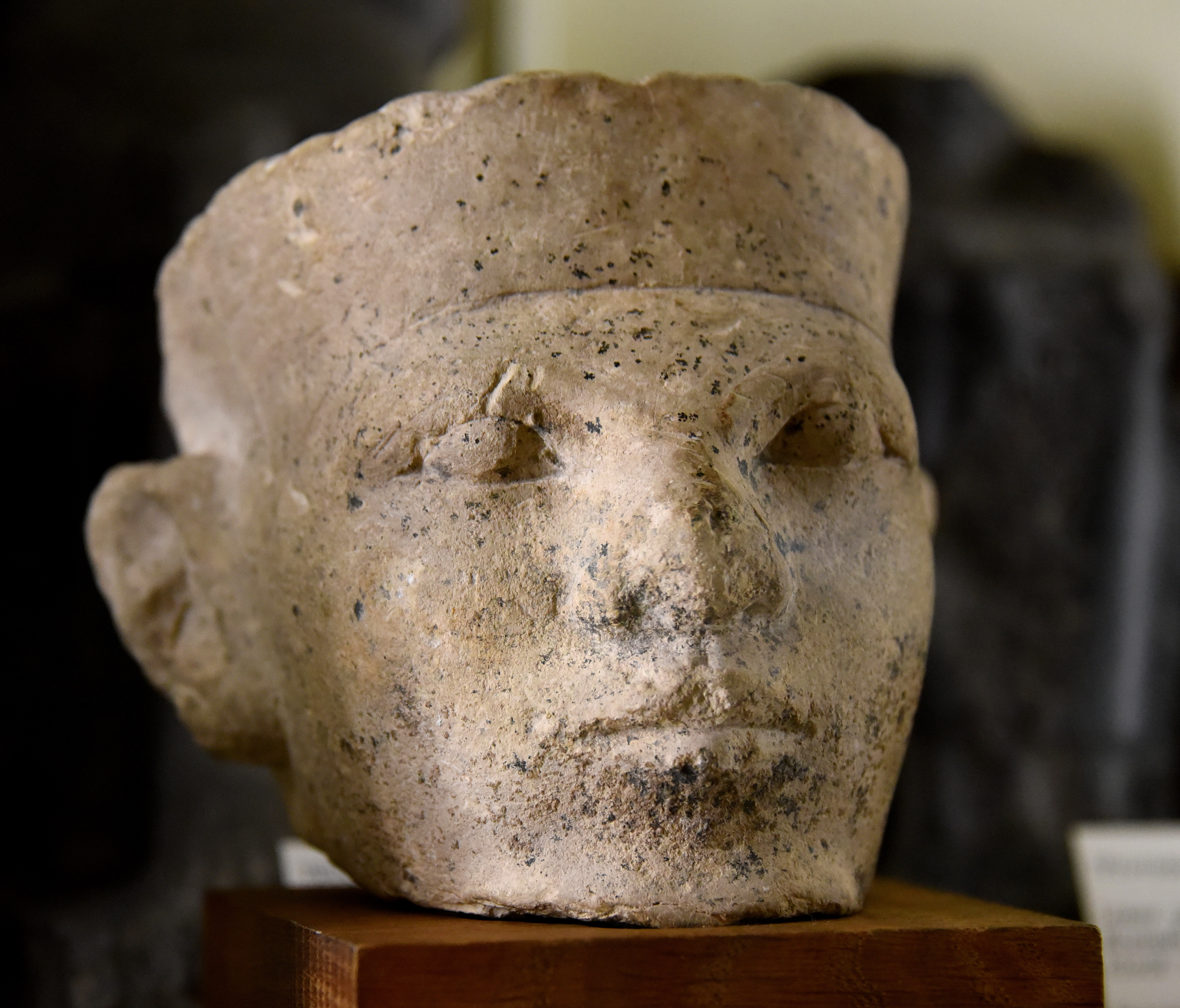
Limestone head of an early Egyptian king, The Petrie Museum. Modern scholars have considered the stone bust to depict an Early Dynastic or Old Kingdom pharaoh.

=== Old Kingdom (2686–2181 BC) ===
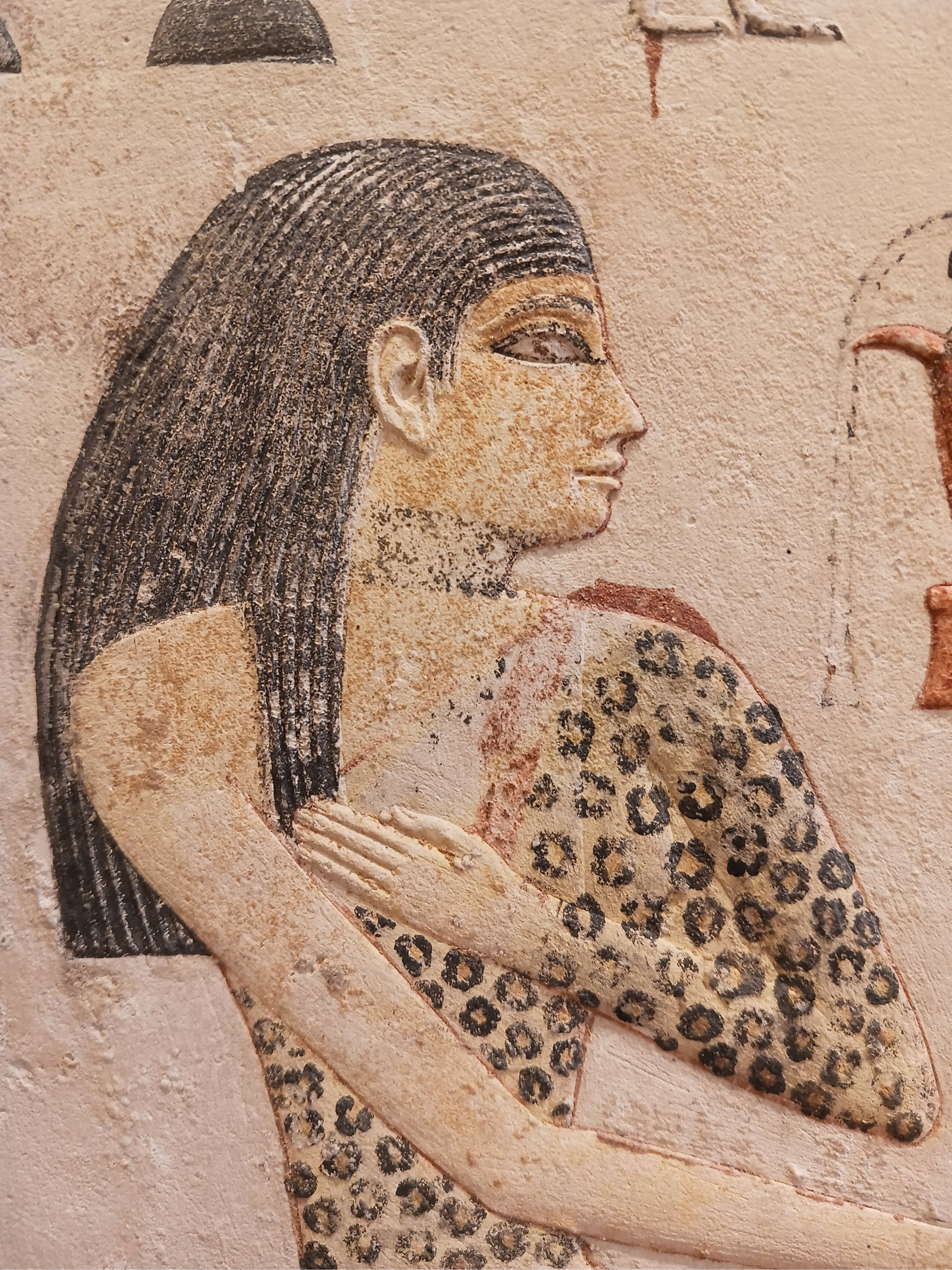
Princess Nefertiabet, likely daughter of Khufu, from her Giza tomb (2590-2565 BC). Louvre Museum E 15591.

The Old Kingdom of Egypt is the period spanning c. 2686–2181 BC. It is also known as the "Age of the Pyramids" or the "Age of the Pyramid Builders", as it encompasses the reigns of the great pyramid builders of the Fourth Dynasty. King Sneferu perfected the art of pyramid-building and the pyramids of Giza were constructed under the kings Khufu, Khafre and Menkaure. Egypt attained its first sustained peak of civilization, the first of three so-called "Kingdom" periods (followed by the Middle Kingdom and New Kingdom) which mark the high points of civilization in the lower Nile Valley.

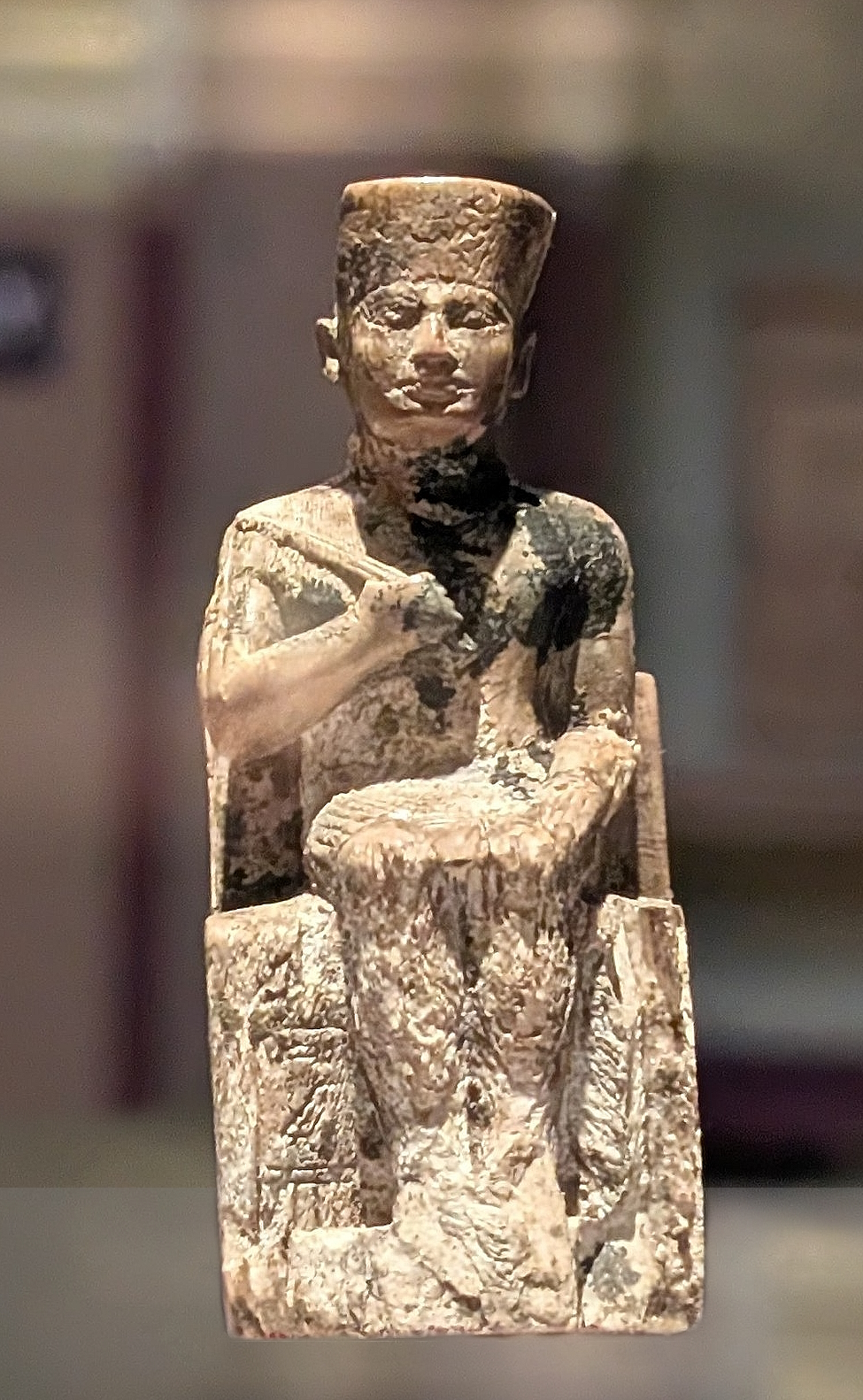
Statue of Pharaoh Khufu/Cheops, Cairo Museum

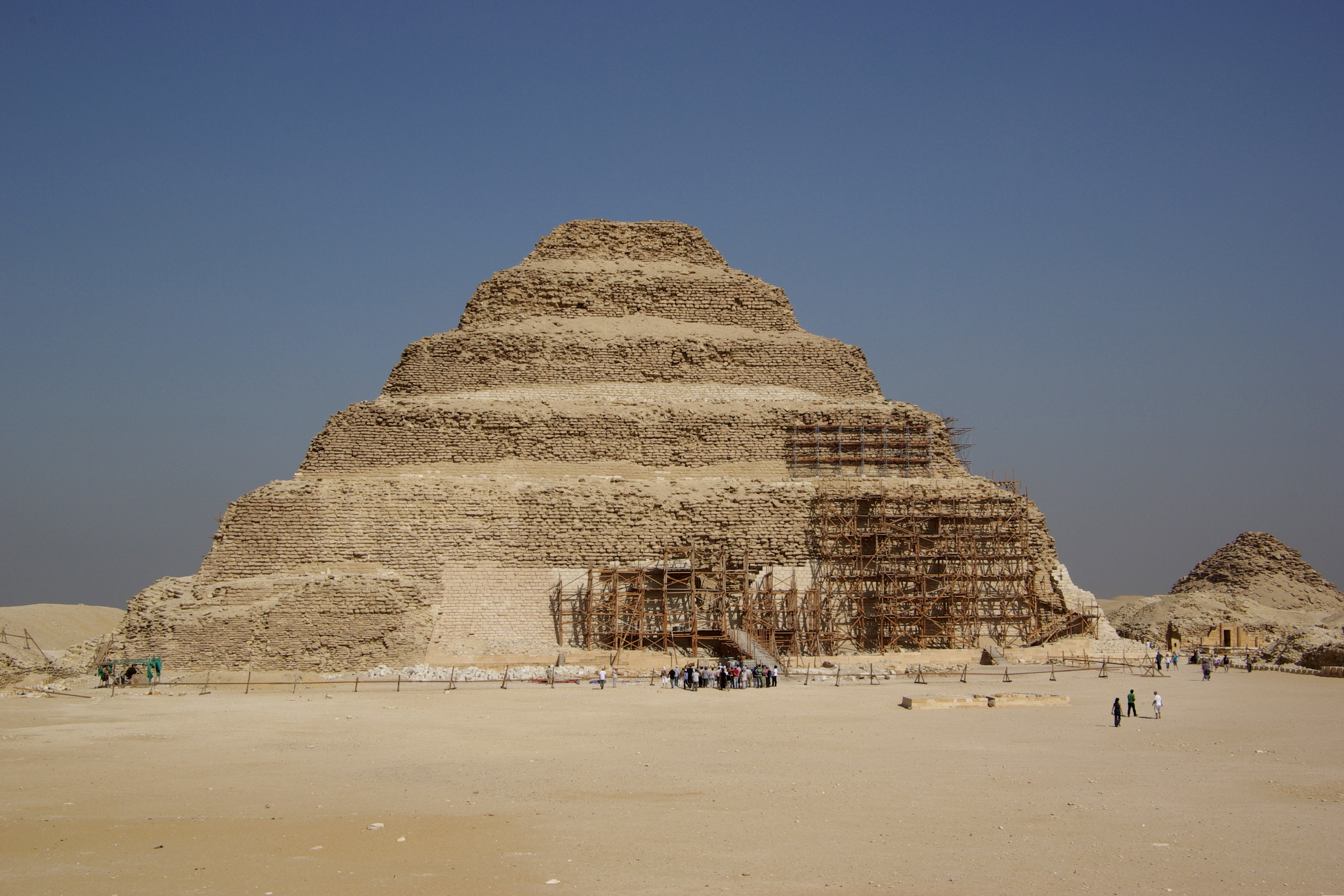
The Pyramid of Djoser at Saqqara, 2667–2648 BC, by Imhotep, the most famous step pyramid of Egypt

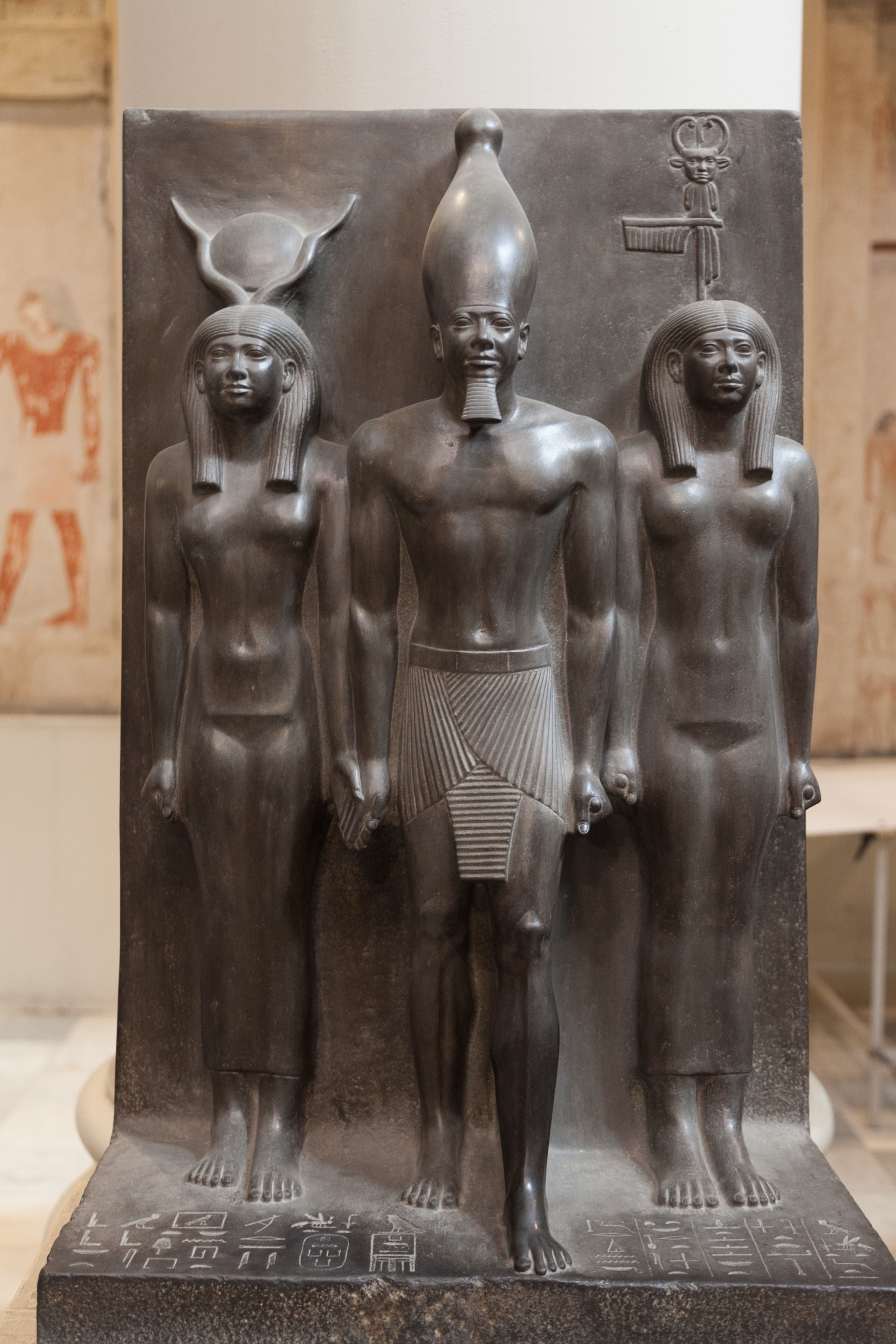
Statue of Menkaure with Hathor and Cynopolis; 2551–2523 BC; schist; height: 95.5 cm; Egyptian Museum (Cairo). Demonstrates a group statue with Old Kingdom features and proportions.

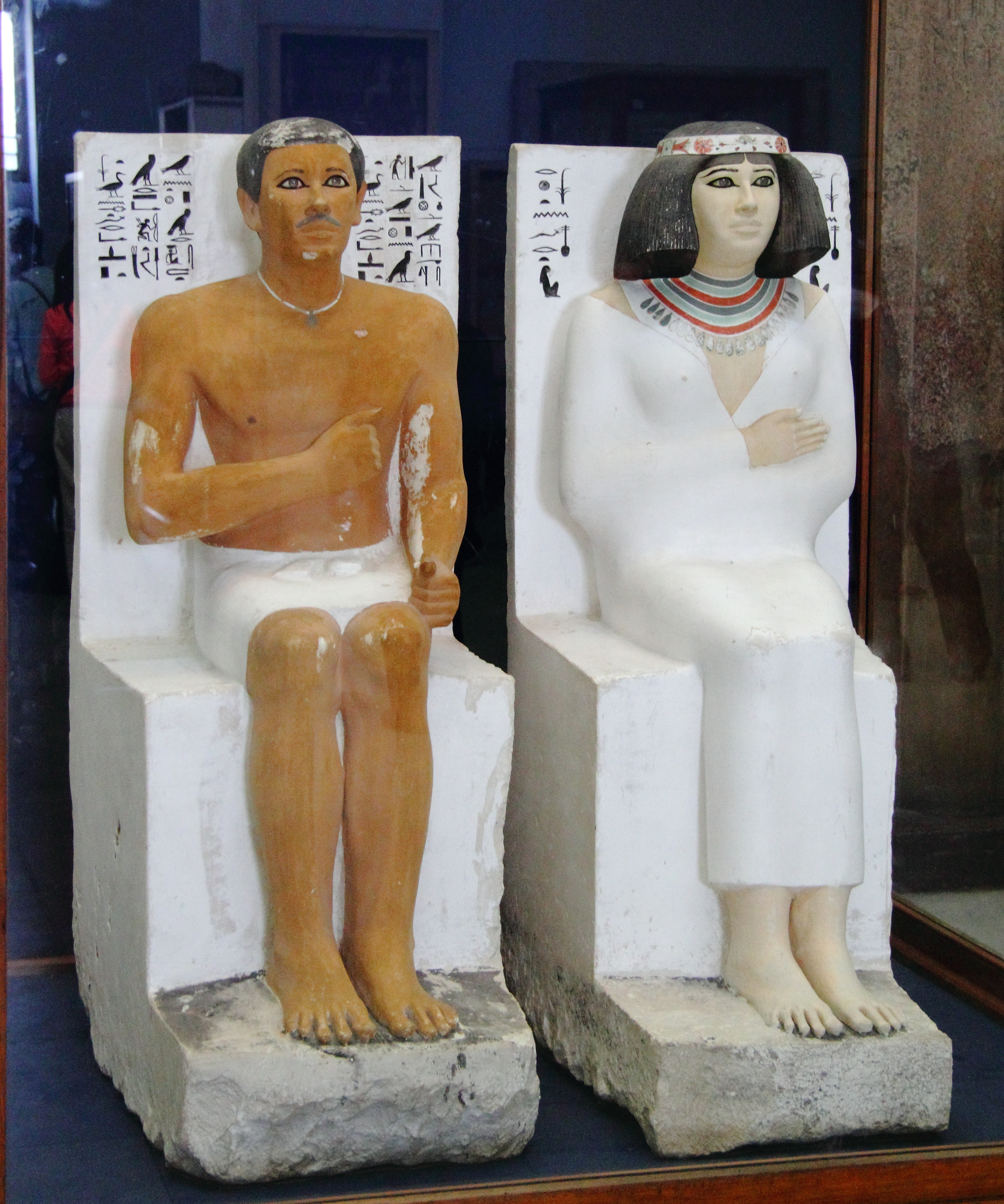
Statues of Prince Rahotep and Nofret, circa 2613-2494 BC, Egyptian museum at Cairo

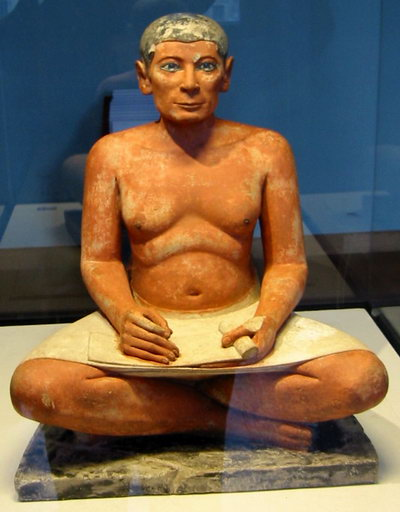
The Seated Scribe at Louvre Museum

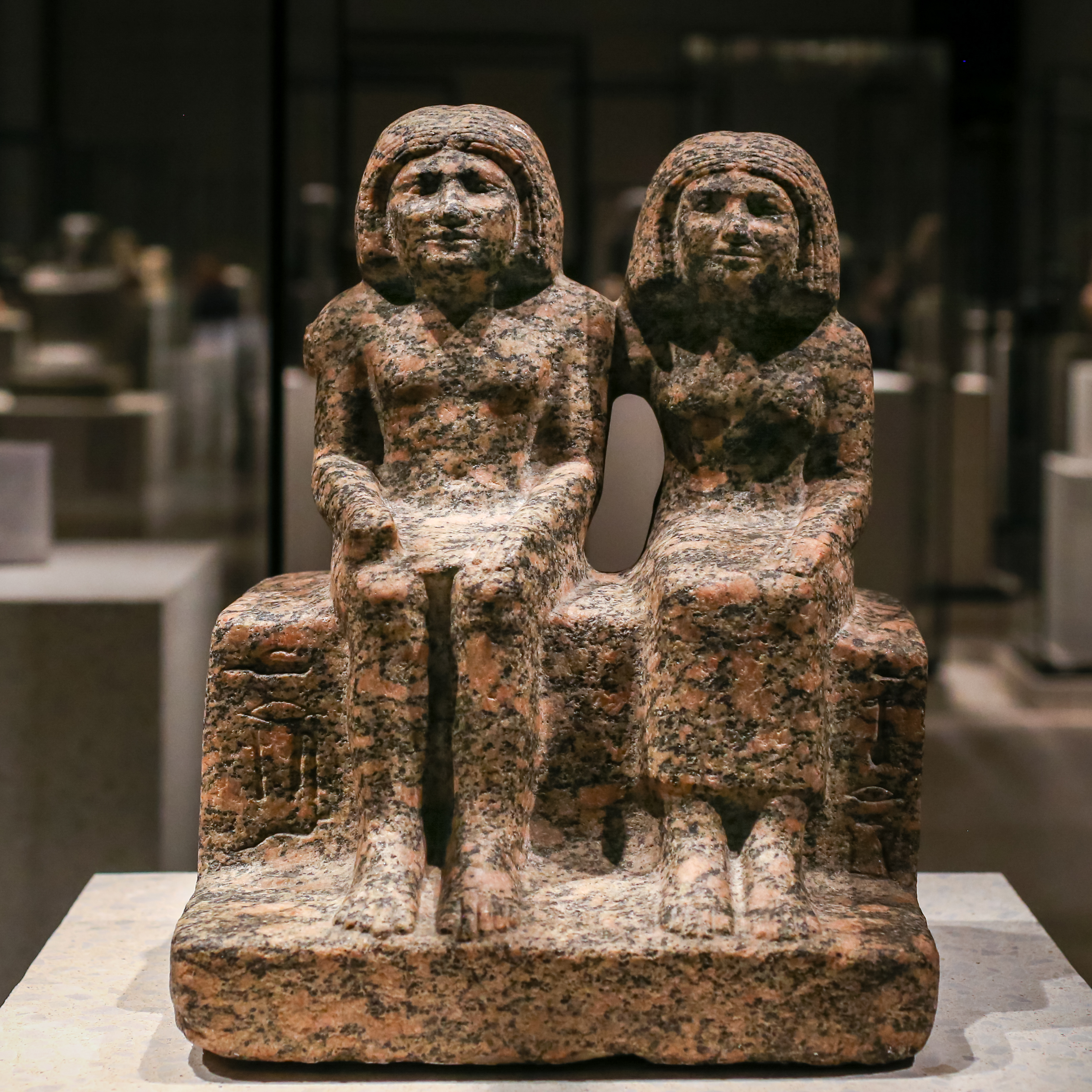
Seated portrait group of Dersenedj and his wife Nofretka; c. 2400 BC; rose granite; Egyptian Museum of Berlin

=== Middle Kingdom (c. 2055–1650 BC) ===
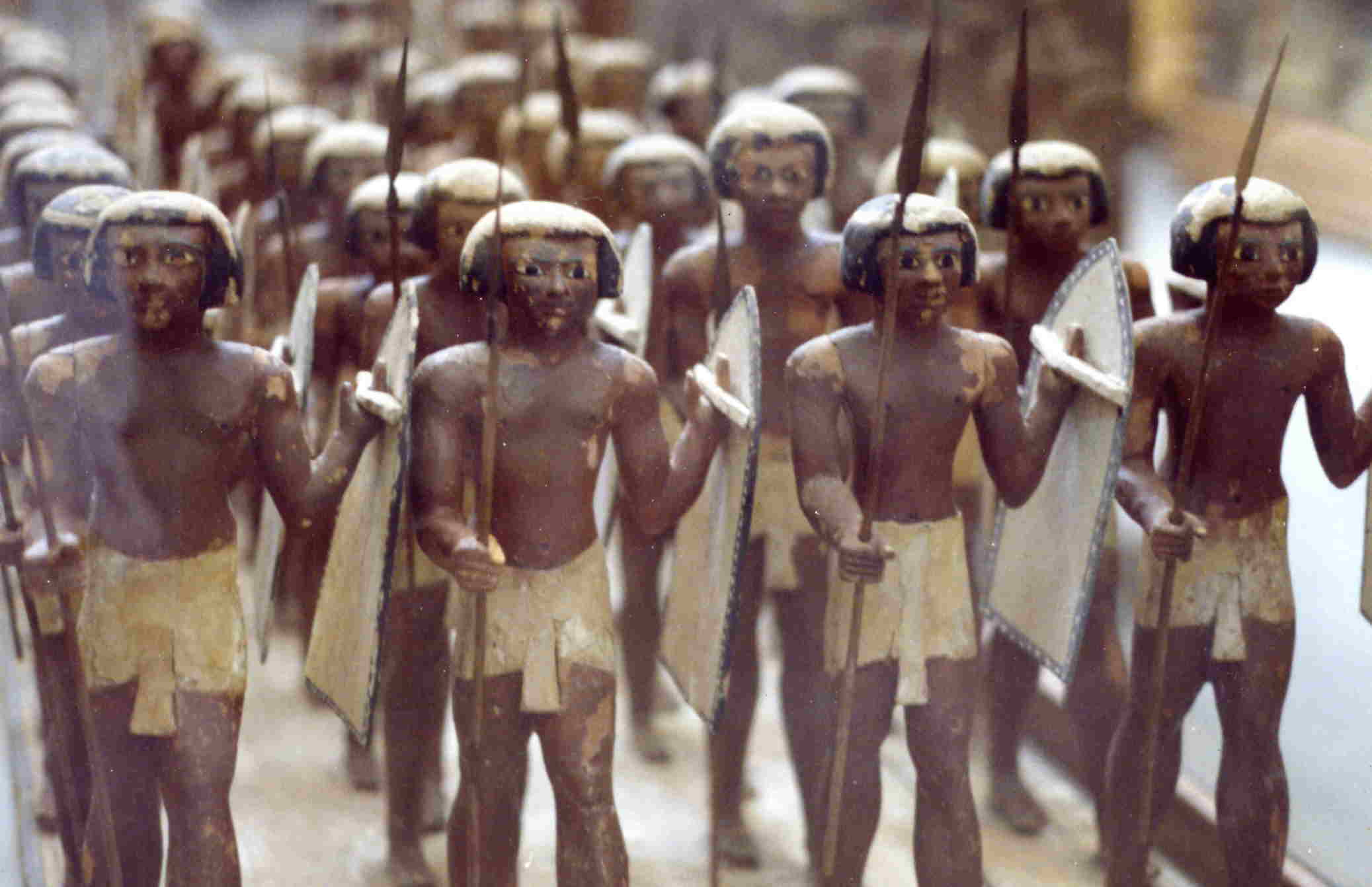
11th Dynasty model of Egyptian soldiers from the tomb of Mesehti, Upper Egypt

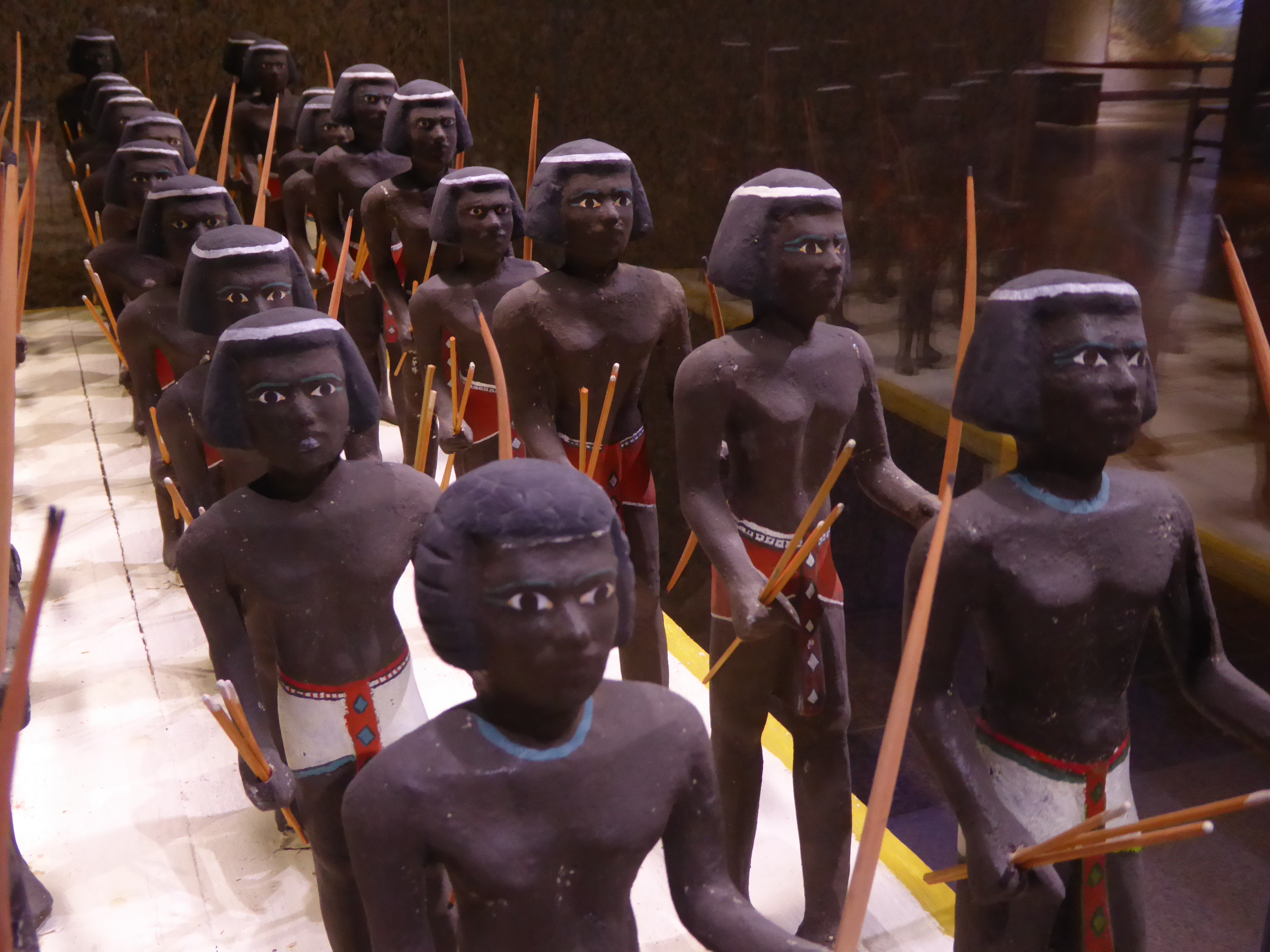
11th Dynasty model of Nubian archers from a tomb in Asyut, Upper Egypt

The Middle Kingdom of Egypt (a.k.a. "the Period of Reunification") is marked by political division known as the First Intermediate Period. The Middle Kingdom lasted from around 2050 BC to around 1710 BC, from the reunification of Egypt under the reign of Mentuhotep II of the Eleventh Dynasty to the end of the Twelfth Dynasty. The Eleventh Dynasty ruled from Thebes and the Twelfth Dynasty ruled from el-Lisht. During the Middle Kingdom period, Osiris became the most important deity in popular religion. The Middle Kingdom was followed by the Second Intermediate Period of Egypt, another period of division that involved foreign invasions of the country by the Hyksos of West Asia.

After the reunification of Egypt in the Middle Kingdom, the kings of the Eleventh and Twelfth Dynasties were able to return their focus to art. In the Eleventh Dynasty, the king's monuments were made in a style influenced by the Memphite models of the Fifth and early Sixth Dynasties and the pre-unification Theban relief style all but disappeared. These changes had an ideological purpose, as the Eleventh Dynasty kings were establishing a centralized state, and returning to the political ideals of the Old Kingdom. In the early Twelfth Dynasty, the artwork had a uniformity of style due to the influence of the royal workshops. It was at this point that the quality of artistic production for the elite members of society reached a high point that was never surpassed, although it was equaled during other periods. Egypt's prosperity in the late Twelfth Dynasty was reflected in the quality of the materials used for royal and private monuments.

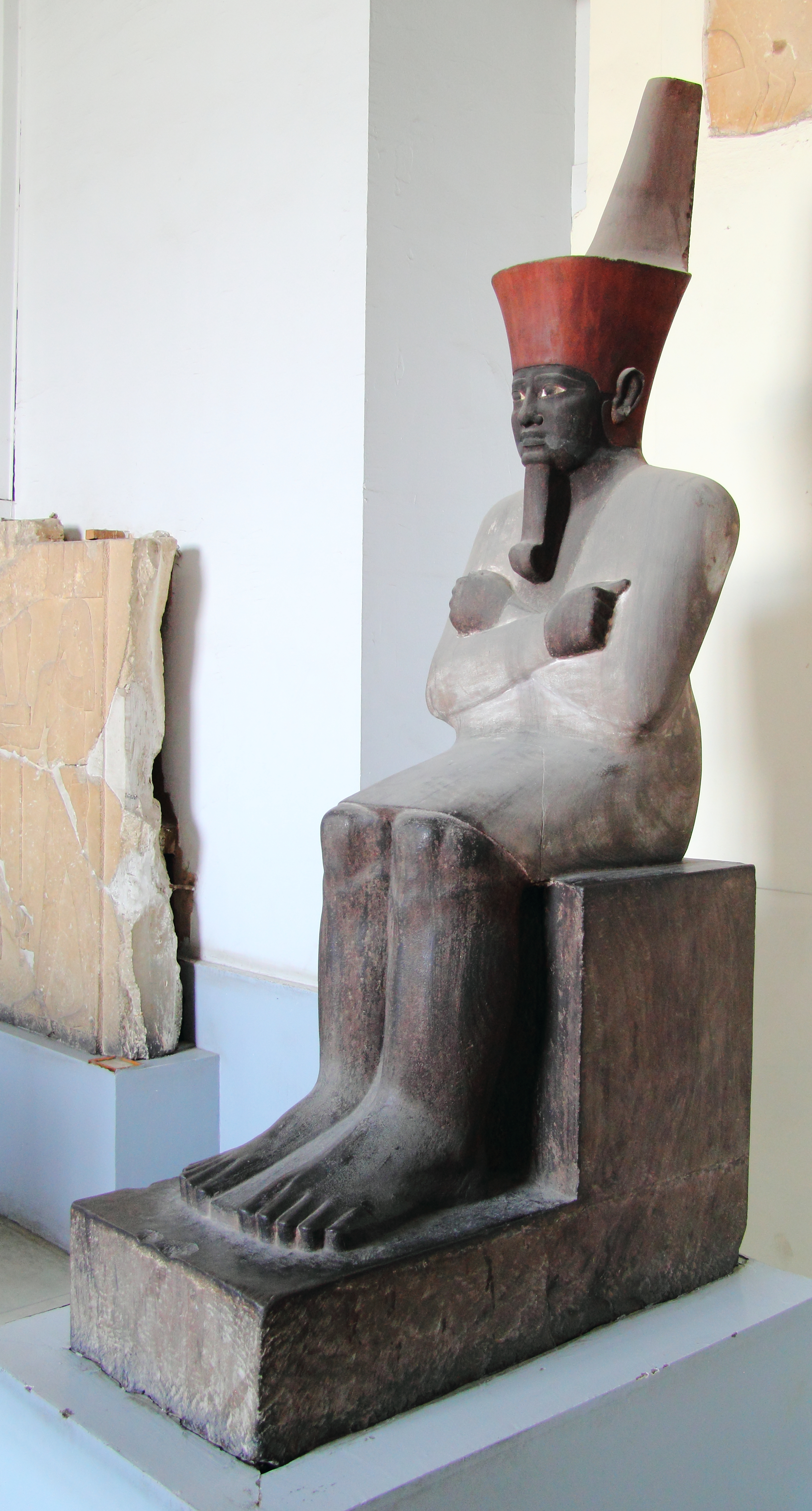
An Osiride statue of the first pharaoh of the Middle Kingdom, Mentuhotep II; 2061–2010 BC; painted sandstone; 138 × 47 cm; Egyptian Museum (Cairo)

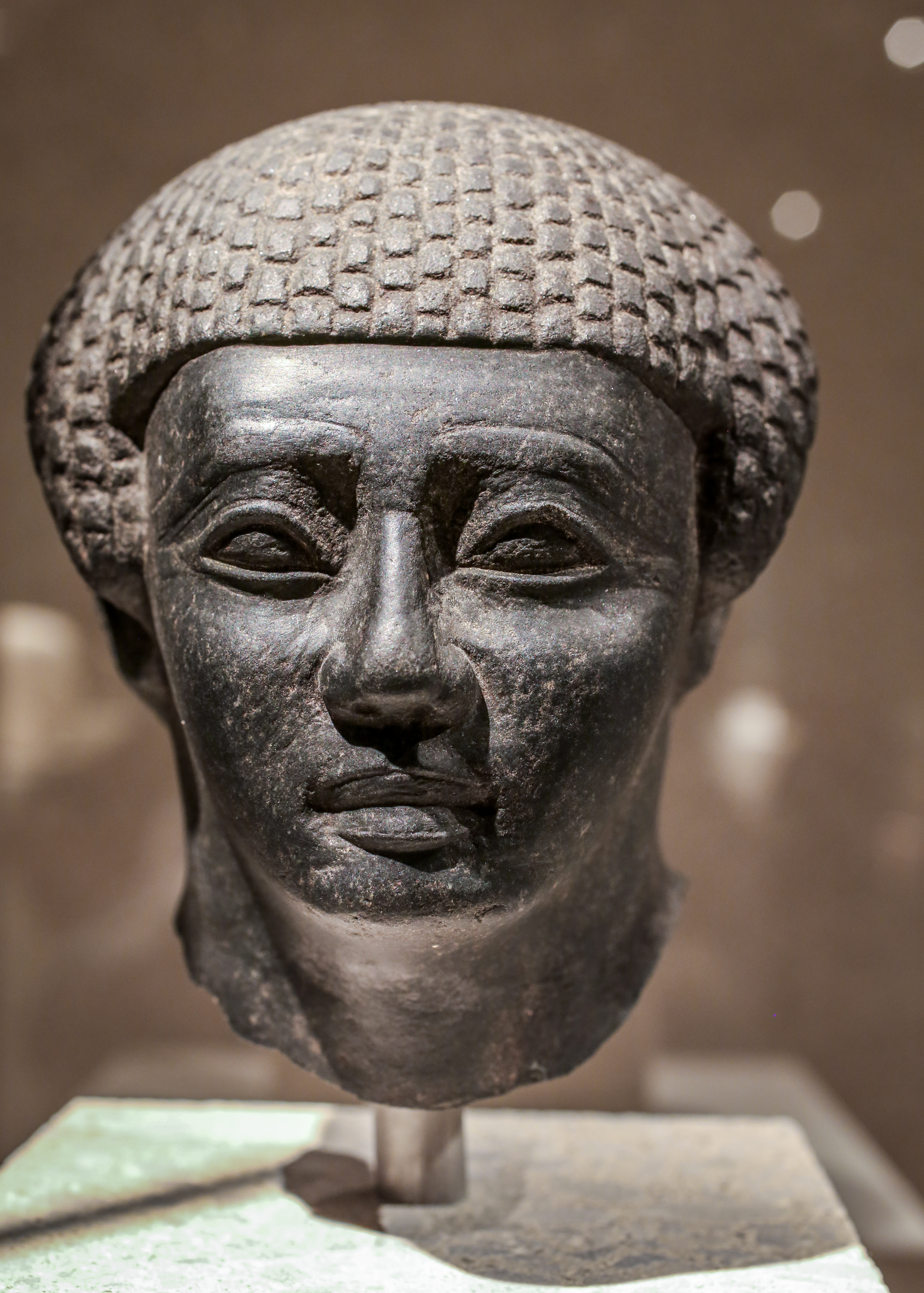
Portrait head of an Egyptian from Thebes; circa 2000 BC; granite; Egyptian Museum of Berlin (Germany)

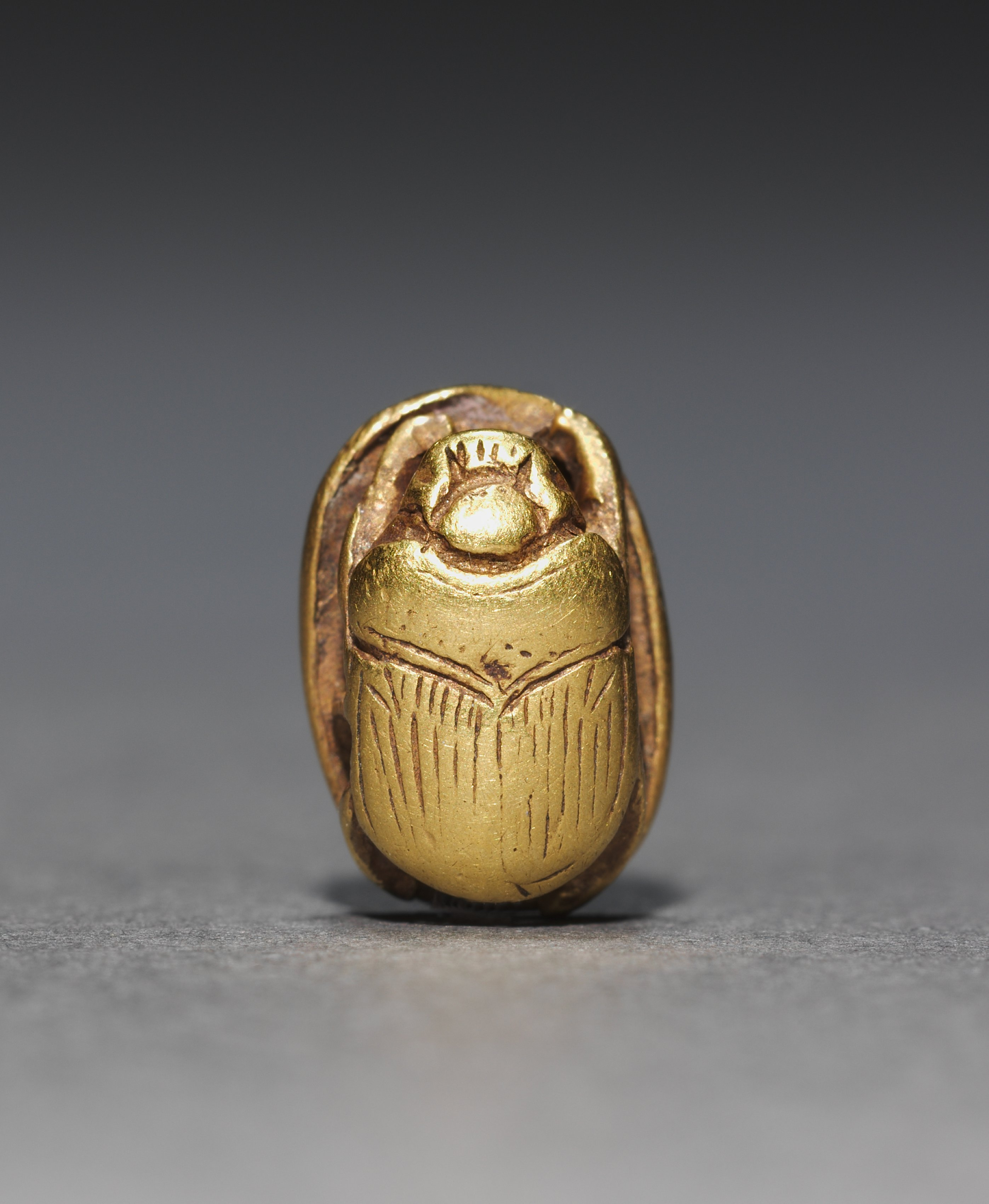
Scarab; c. 1980 BC; gold; overall: 1.1 cm; Cleveland Museum of Art (Cleveland, Ohio, US)

Coffin of Senbi; 1918–1859 BC; gessoed and painted cedar; overall: 70 x 55 cm; Cleveland Museum of Art

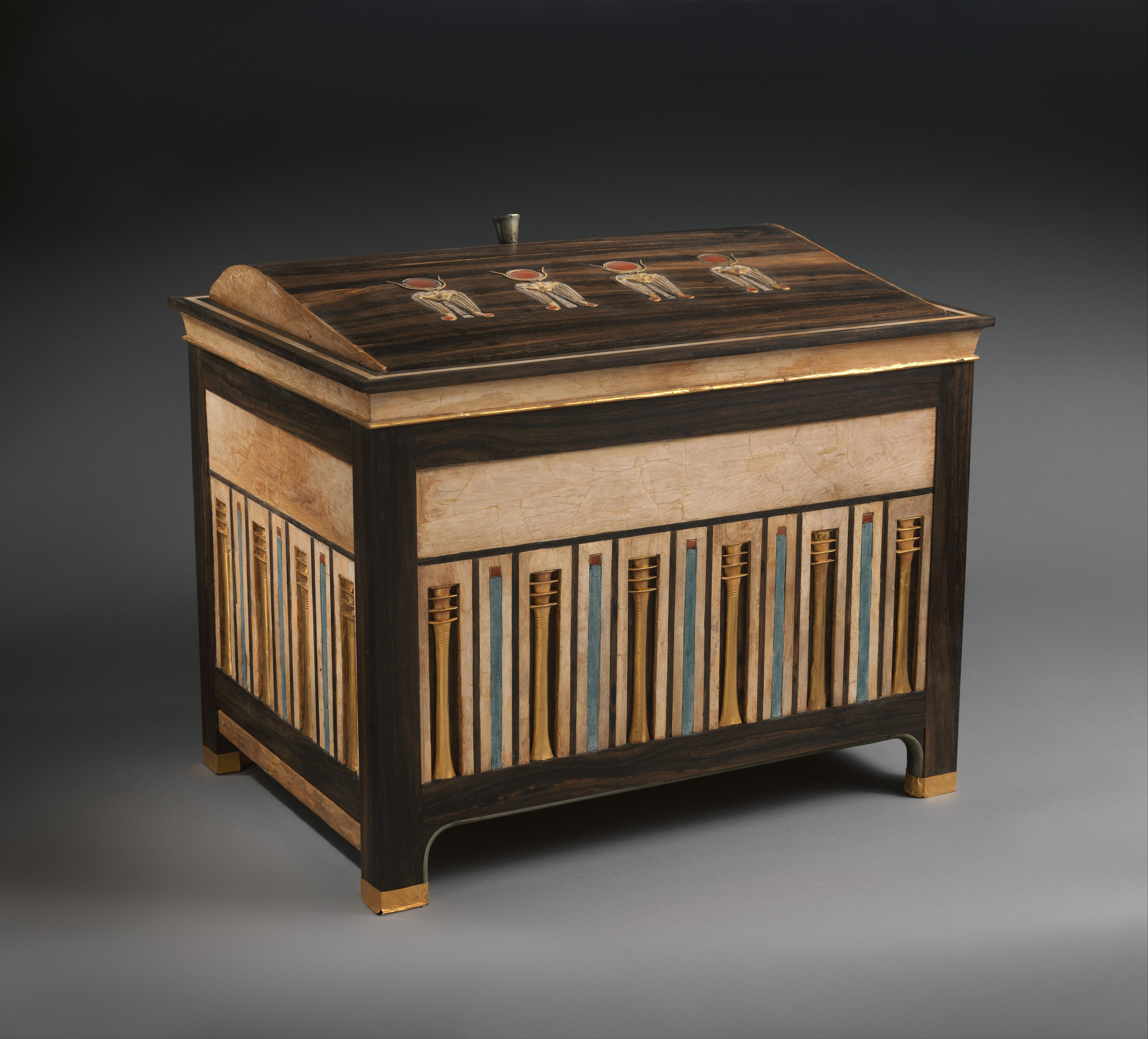
Jewelry chest of Sithathoryunet; 1887–1813 BC; ebony, ivory, gold, carnelian, blue faience and silver; height: 36.7 cm; Metropolitan Museum of Art

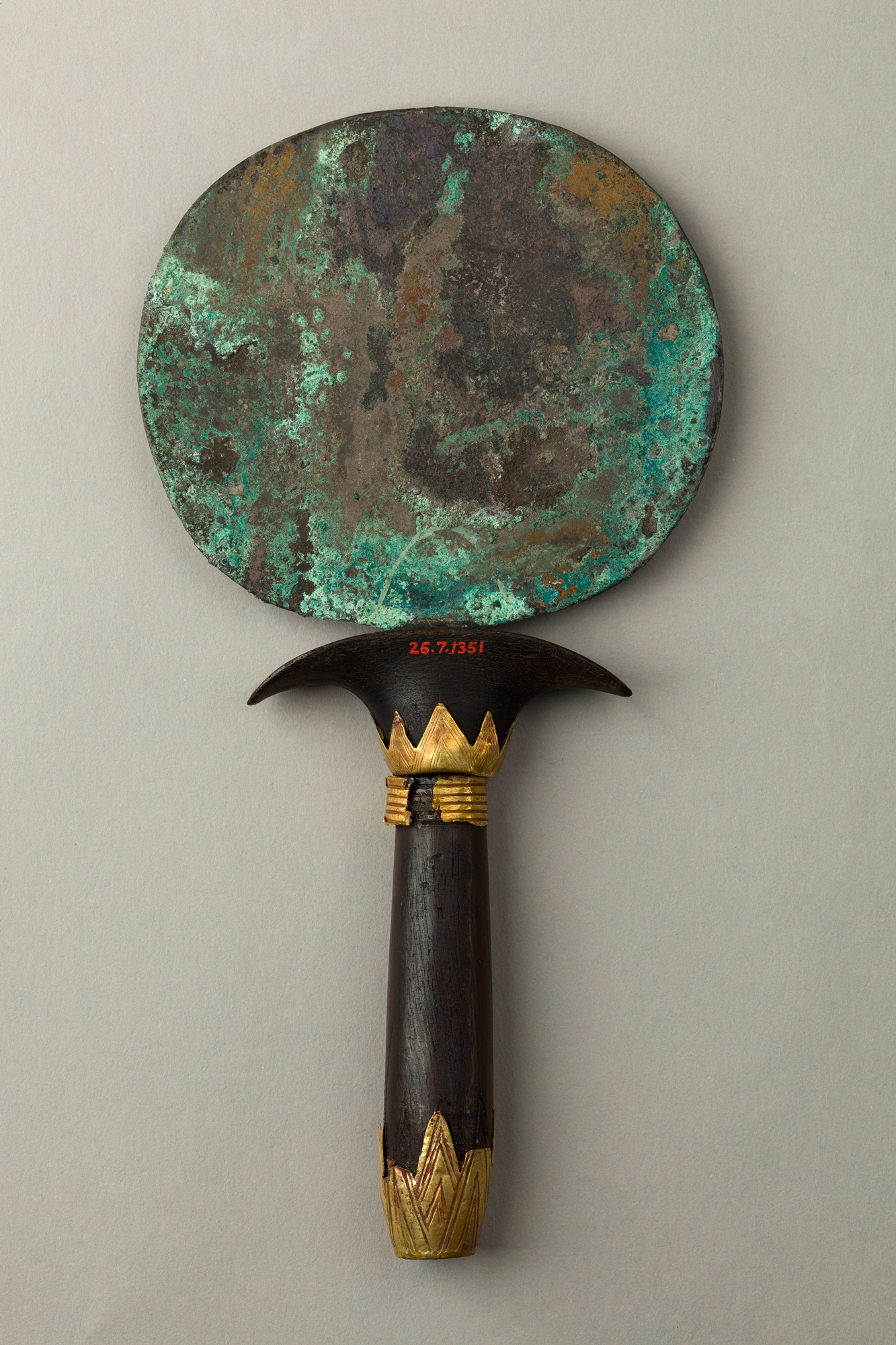
Mirror with a papyrus-shaped handle; 1810–1700 BC; unalloyed copper, gold and ebony; 22.3 × 11.3 × 2.5 cm; Metropolitan Museum of Art

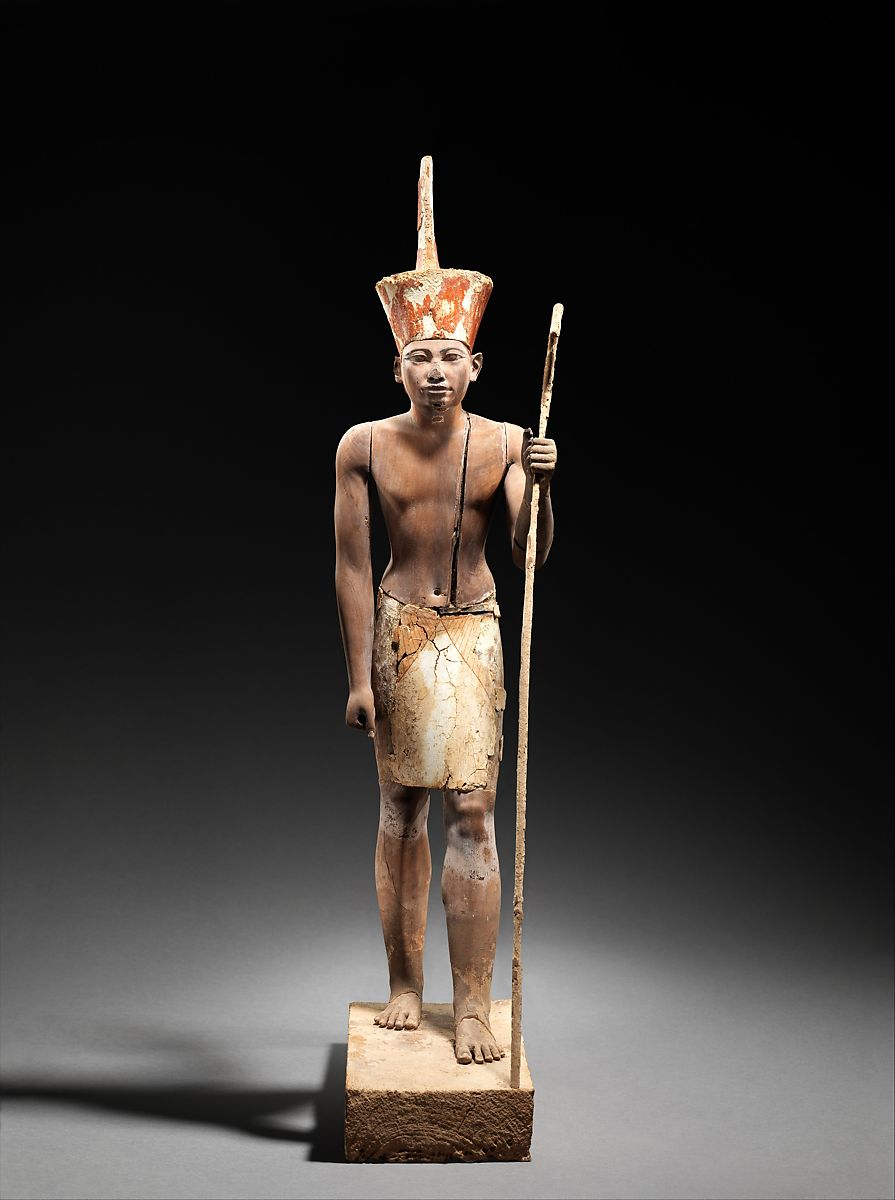
A guardian statue which reflects the facial features of the reigning king, probably Amenemhat I or Senwosret I, and which functioned as a divine guardian for the imiut. Made of cedar wood and plaster c. 1919–1885 BC

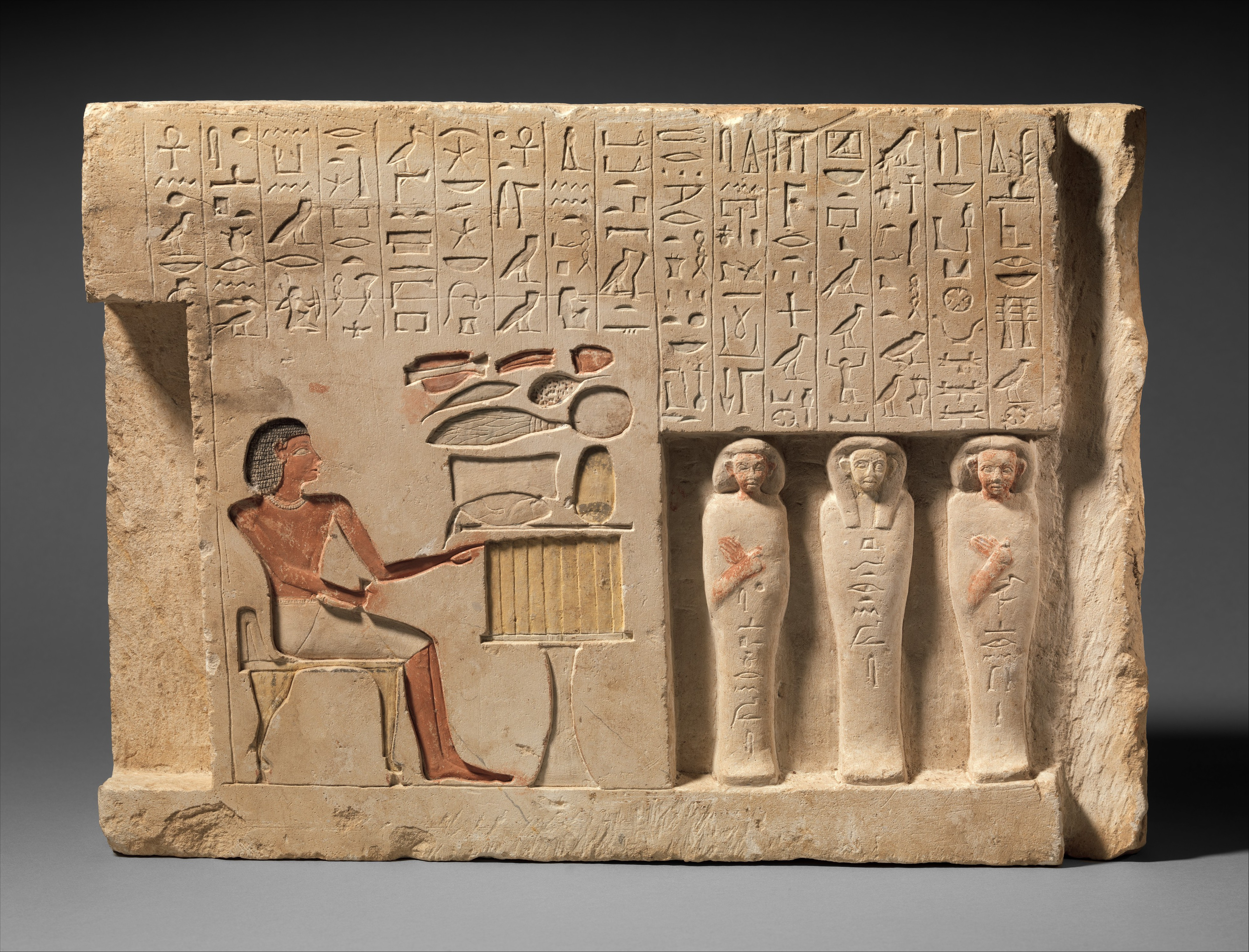
Relief from the chapel of the overseer of the troops Sehetepibre; 1802–1640 BC; painted limestone; 30.5 × 42.5 cm; Metropolitan Museum of Art
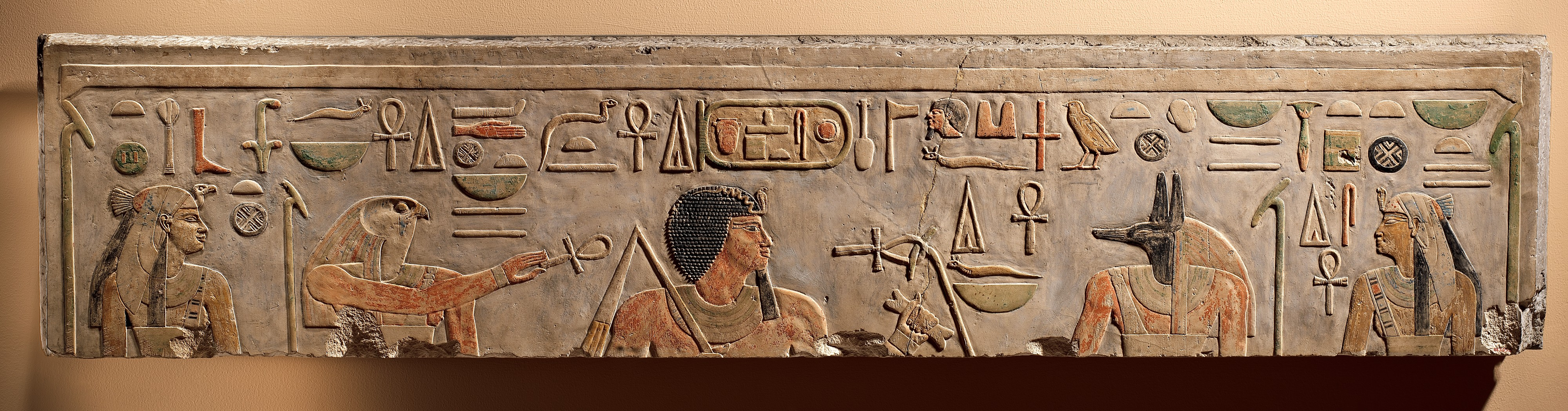
Lintel of Amenemhat I and deities; 1981–1952 BC; painted limestone; 36.8 × 172 cm; Metropolitan Museum of Art (New York City)

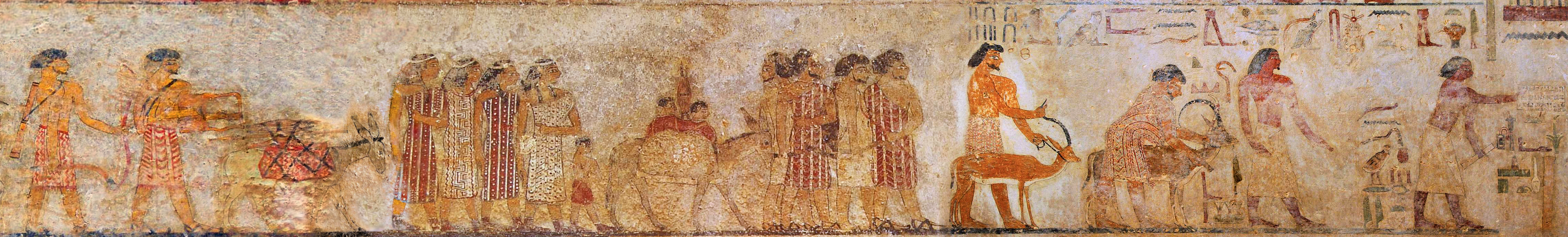
A group of West Asiatic peoples (possibly Canaanites and precursors of the future Hyksos) depicted entering Egypt circa 1900 BC. From the tomb of a 12th dynasty official Khnumhotep II.

=== Second Intermediate Period (c. 1650–1550 BC) ===
The so-called "Hyksos sphinxes"
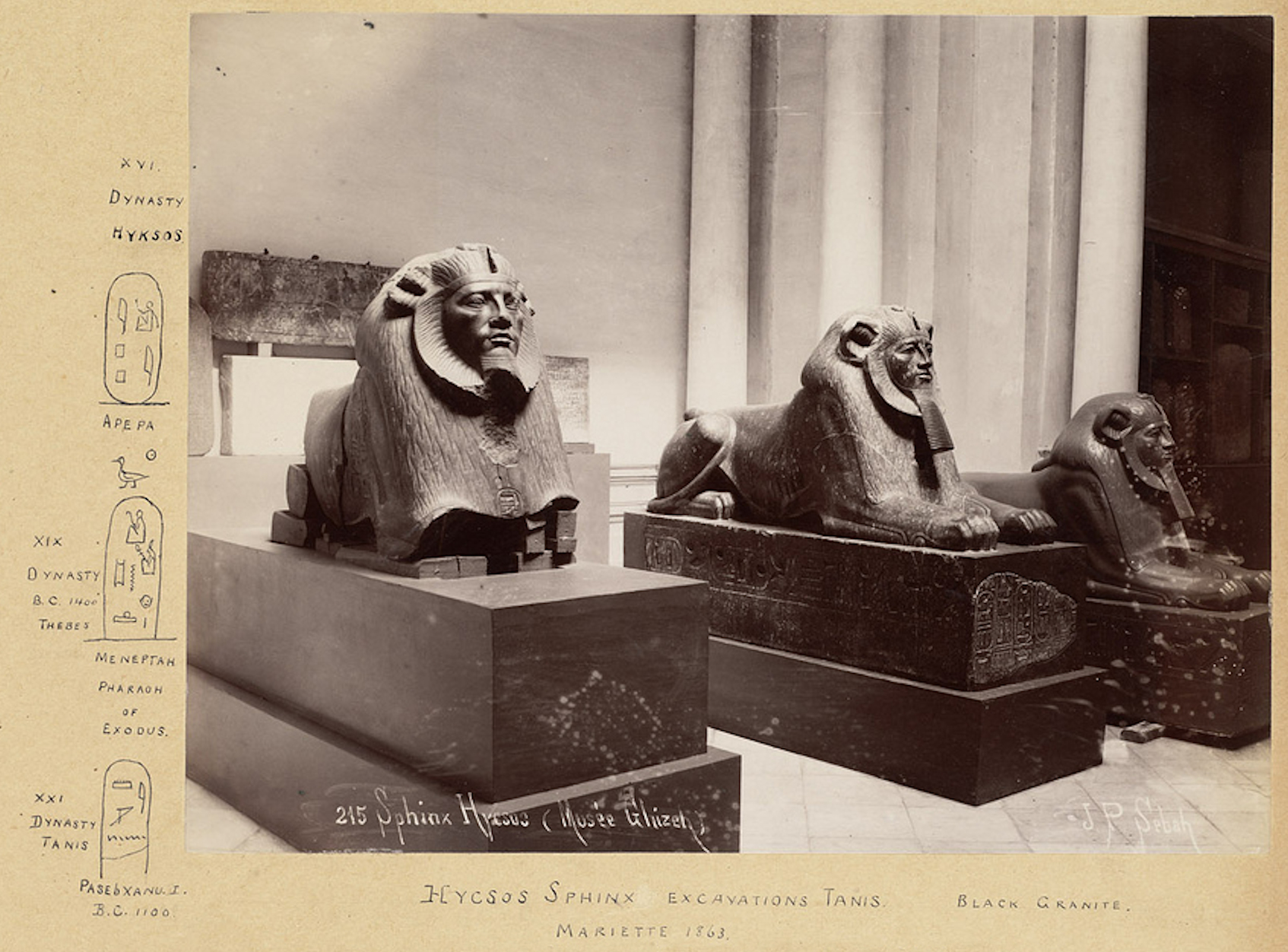
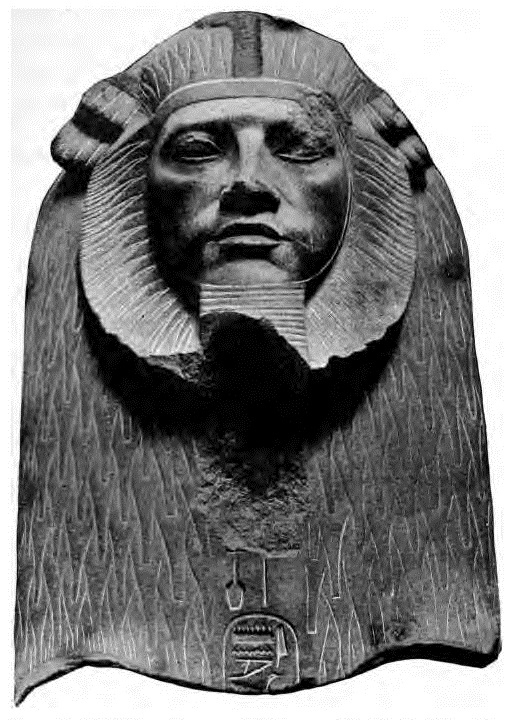
The so-called "Hyksos sphinxes" are peculiar sphinxes of Amenemhat III which were reinscribed by several Hyksos rulers, including Apepi. Earlier Egyptologists thought these were the faces of actual Hyksos rulers.

The Hyksos, a dynasty of rulers originating from the Levant, do not appear to have produced any court art, instead appropriating monuments from earlier dynasties by writing their names on them. Many of these are inscribed with the name of King Khyan. A large palace at Avaris has been uncovered, built in the Levantine rather than the Egyptian style, most likely by Khyan. King Apepi is known to have patronized Egyptian scribal culture, commissioning the copying of the Rhind Mathematical Papyrus. The stories preserved in the Westcar Papyrus may also date from his reign.

The so-called "Hyksos sphinxes" or "Tanite sphinxes" are a group of royal sphinxes depicting the earlier Pharaoh Amenemhat III (Twelfth Dynasty) with some unusual traits compared to conventional statuary, for example prominent cheekbones and the thick mane of a lion, instead of the traditional nemes headcloth. The name "Hyksos sphinxes" was given due to the fact that these were later reinscribed by several of the Hyksos kings, and were initially thought to represent the Hyksos kings themselves. These sphinxes were seized by the Hyksos from cities of the Middle Kingdom and then transported to their capital Avaris where they were reinscribed with the names of their new owners and adorned their palace. Seven of those sphinxes are known, all from Tanis, and now mostly located in the Cairo Museum. Other statues of Amenehat III were found in Tanis and are associated with the Hyksos in the same manner.

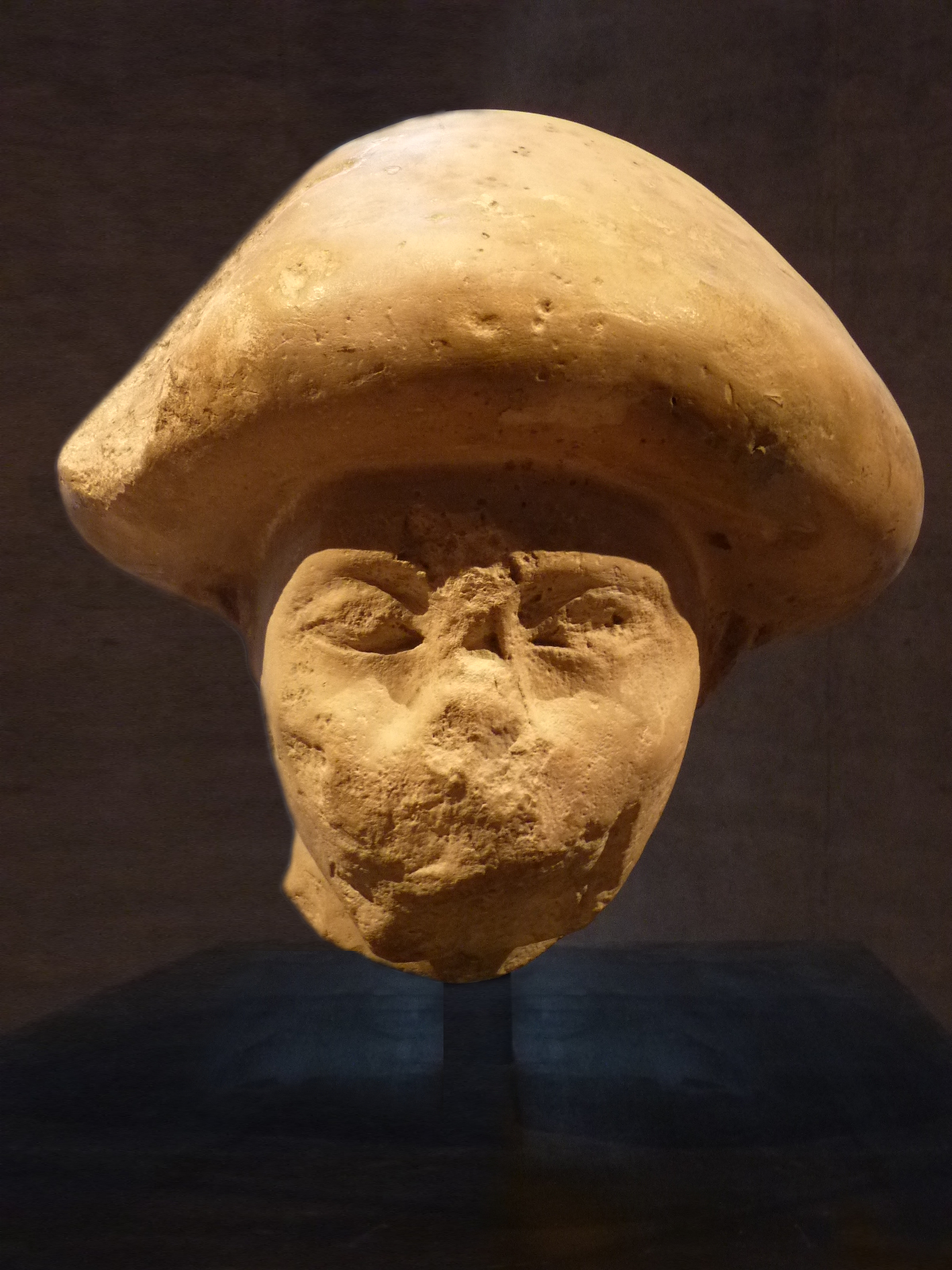
An official wearing the "mushroom-headed" hairstyle also seen in contemporary paintings of Western Asiatic foreigners such as in the tomb of Khnumhotep II, at Beni Hasan. Excavated in Avaris, the Hyksos capital. Staatliche Sammlung für Ägyptische Kunst.

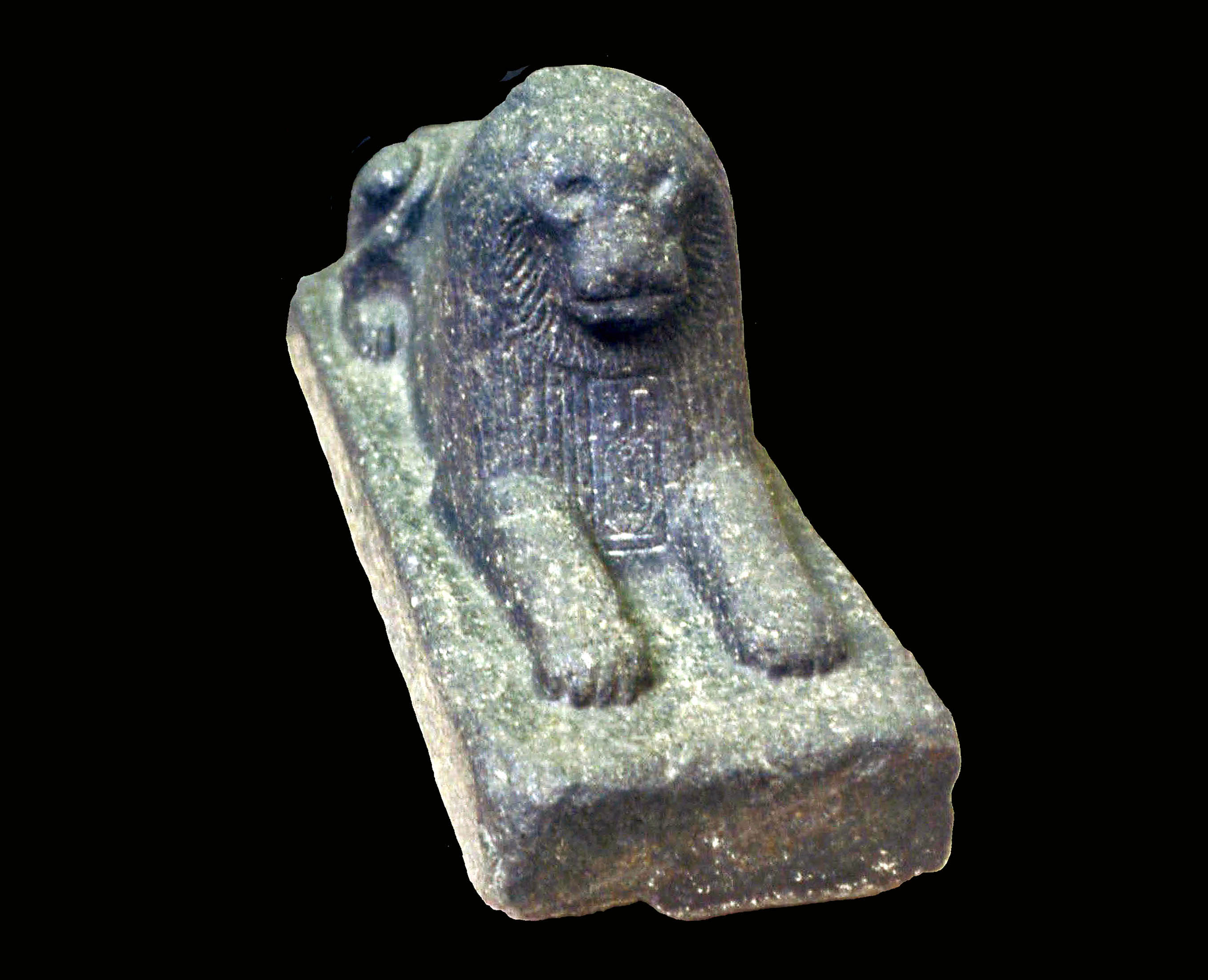
Lion inscribed with the name of the Hyksos ruler Khyan, found in Baghdad, suggesting relations with Babylon. The prenomen of Khyan and epithet appear on the breast. British Museum, EA 987.

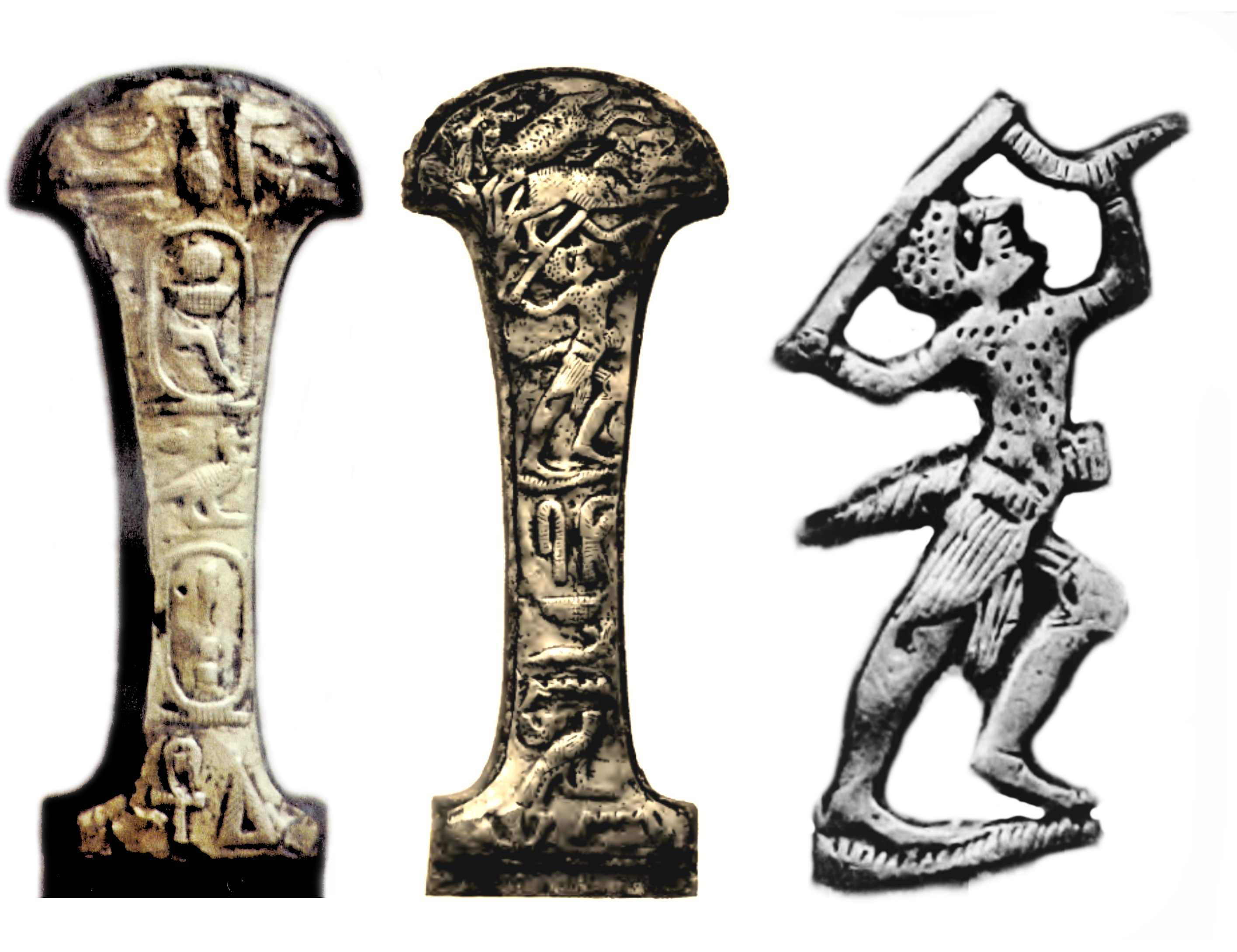
Electrum dagger handle of a soldier of Hyksos Pharaoh Apepi, illustrating the soldier hunting with a short bow and sword. Inscriptions: "The perfect god, the lord of the two lands, Nebkhepeshre Apepi" and "Follower of his lord Nehemen", found at a burial at Saqqara. Now at the Luxor Museum.

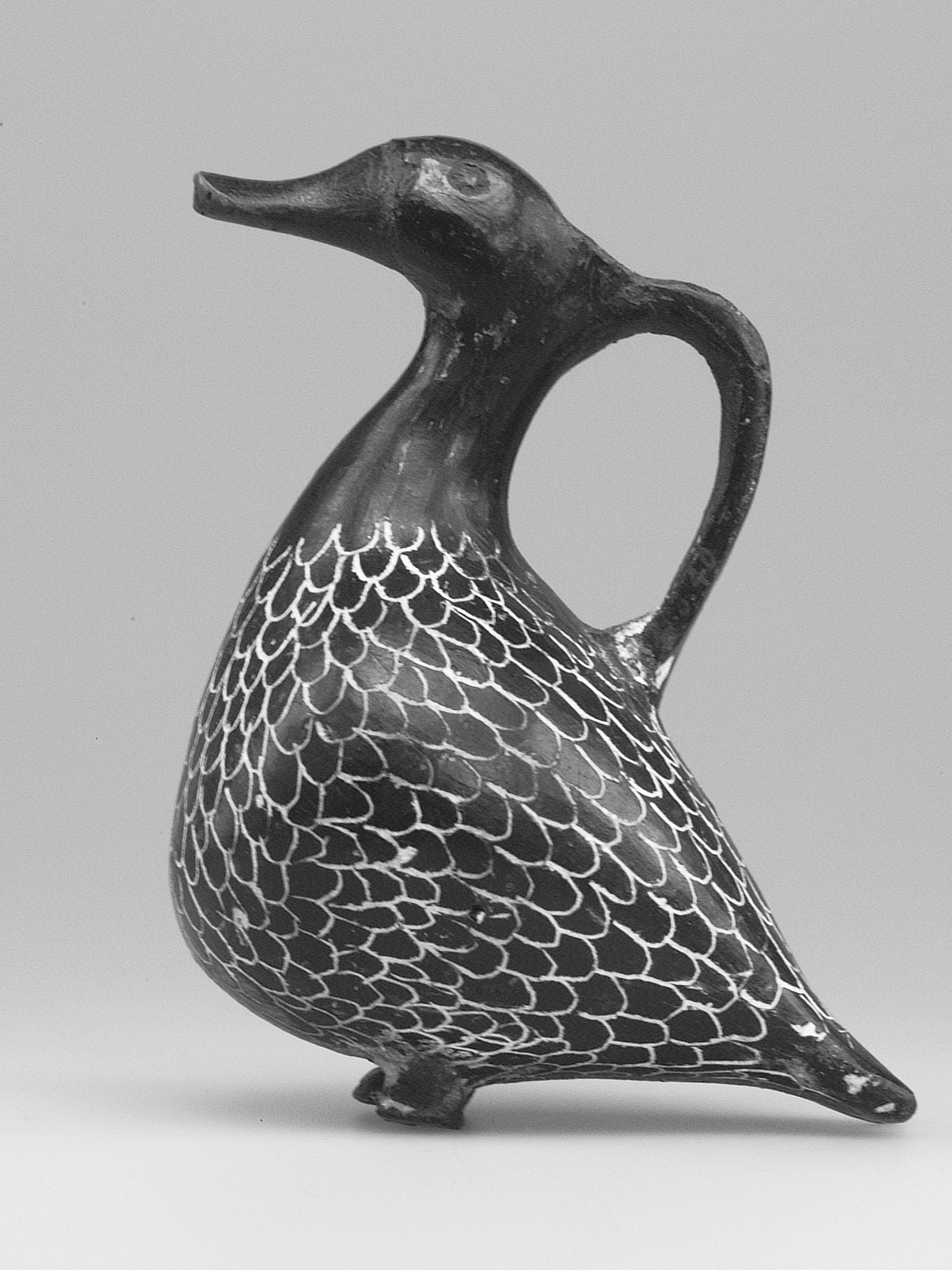
An example of Egyptian Tell el-Yahudiyeh Ware, a Levantine-influenced style.

=== New Kingdom (c. 1550–1069 BC) ===
The New Kingdom, also referred to as the "Egyptian Empire", is the period between the 16th and 11th centuries BC, covering the 18th, 19th, and 20th dynasties of Egypt. The New Kingdom followed the Second Intermediate Period and was succeeded by the Third Intermediate Period. It was Egypt's most prosperous time and marked the peak of its power. This tremendous wealth can be attributed to the centralization of bureaucratic power and many successful military campaigns which opened trade routes. With the expansion of the Egyptian Empire, Kings gained access to important commodities such as cedar from Lebanon and luxury materials such as lapis lazuli and turquoise.

The artwork produced during the New Kingdom falls into three broad periods: Pre-Amarna, Amarna, and Ramesside. Although stylistic changes as a result of shifts in power and variation of religious ideals occurred, the statuary and relief work throughout the New Kingdom continued to embody the main principles of Egyptian art: frontality and axiality, hierarchy of scale, and composite composition.

==== Pre-Amarna ====
The Pre-Amarna period, the beginning of the eighteenth dynasty of the New Kingdom, was marked by the growing power of Egypt as an expansive empire. The artwork reflects a combination of Middle Kingdom techniques and subjects with the newly accessed materials and styles of foreign lands. A large portion of the art and architecture of the Pre-Amarna period was produced by the female king Hatshepshut, who led a widespread building campaign to all gods during her reign from 1473 to 1458 BC. She made significant additions to the temple at Karnak, undertook the construction of an extensive mortuary temple at Deir el-Bahri, and produced a prolific amount of statuary and relief work in hard stone. The extent of these building projects was made possible by the centralization of power in Thebes and reopening of trade routes by previous New Kingdom ruler Ahmose I.

Hatshepsut's elaborate mortuary temple at Deir el-Bahri provides many well-preserved examples of the artwork produced during the Pre-Amarna period. The massive three-level, colonnaded temple was built into the cliffs of Thebes and adorned with extensive painted relief. Subjects of these reliefs ranged from traditional funerary images and legitimization of Hatshepsut as the divine ruler of Egypt to battle and expedition scenes in foreign lands. The temple also housed numerous statues of the female king and gods, particularly Amun-ra, some of which were colossal in scale. The artwork from Hatshepshut's reign is trademarked by the re-integration of Northern culture and style as a result of the reunification of Egypt. Thutmoses III, the predecessor to Hatshepsut, also commissioned vast amounts of large-scale artwork and by his death Egypt was the most powerful empire in the world.

===== State-Sponsored Temples =====
During the New Kingdom – the 18th Dynasty especially – it was common for Kings to commission large and elaborate temples dedicated to the major gods of Egypt. These structures, built from limestone or sandstone (materials more permanent than the mud brick used for earlier temples) and filled with rare materials and vibrant wall paintings, exemplify the wealth and access to resources that Egyptian Empire enjoyed during the New Kingdom. The temple at Karnak, dedicated to Amun-ra, is one of the largest and best surviving examples of this type of state-sponsored architecture.

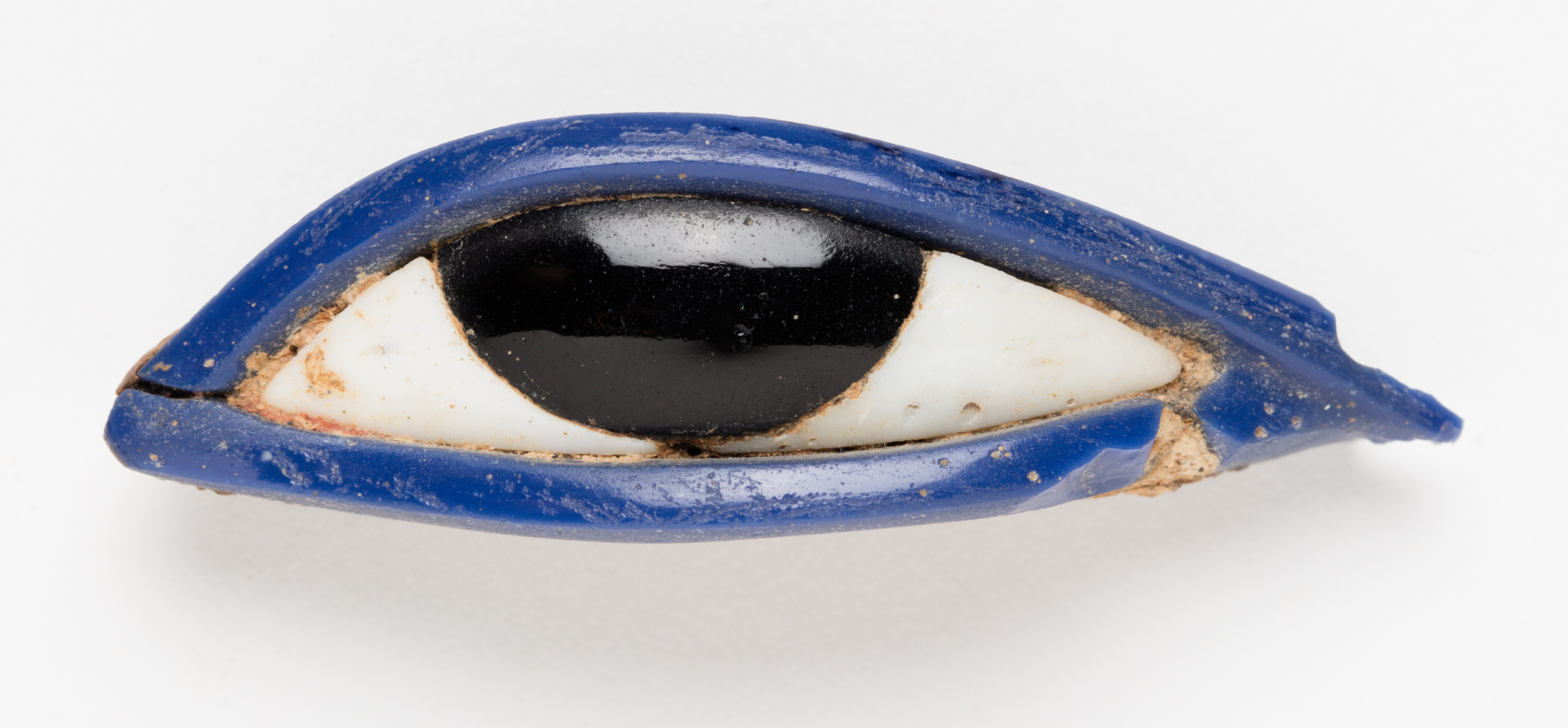
Eye; 1550–1069 BC; alabaster eye from a coffin; length: 50.8 mm; Auckland War Memorial Museum (Auckland, New Zealand)

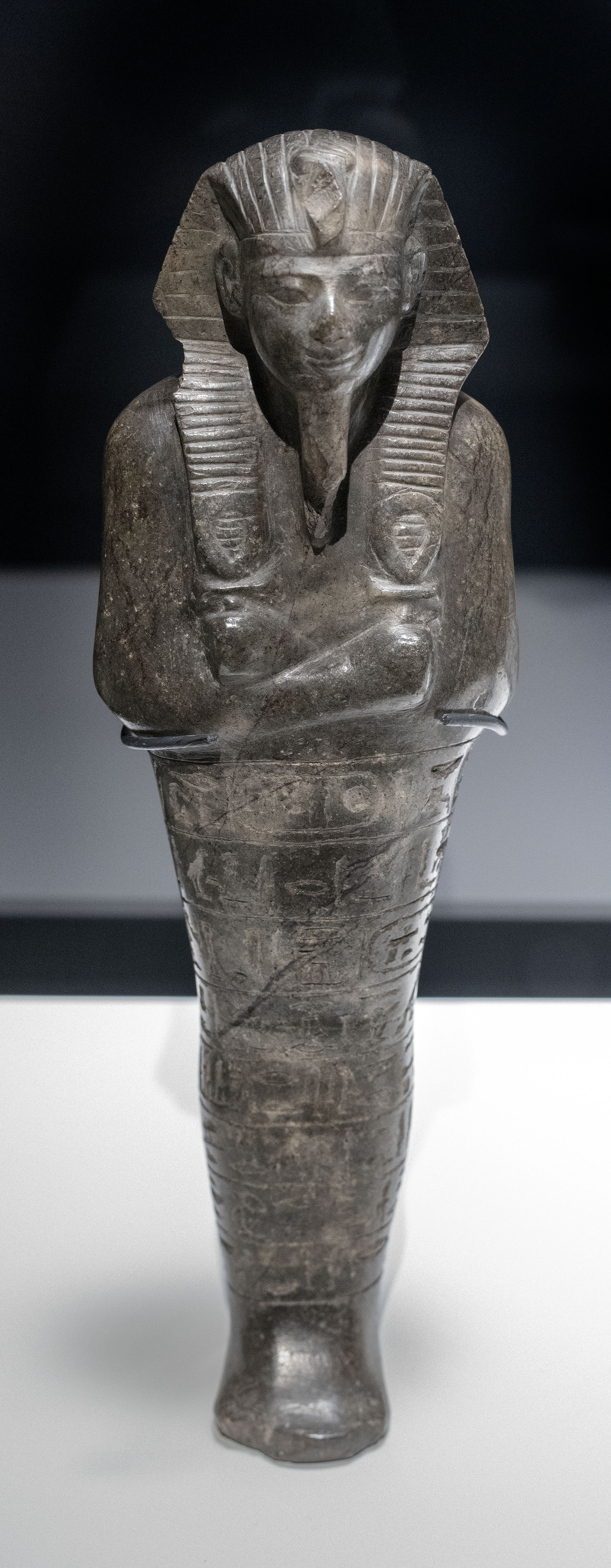
Ushabti of Amenhotep II; 1427–1400 BC; serpentine; 29 × 9 × 0.65 cm, 1.4 kg; British Museum (London)

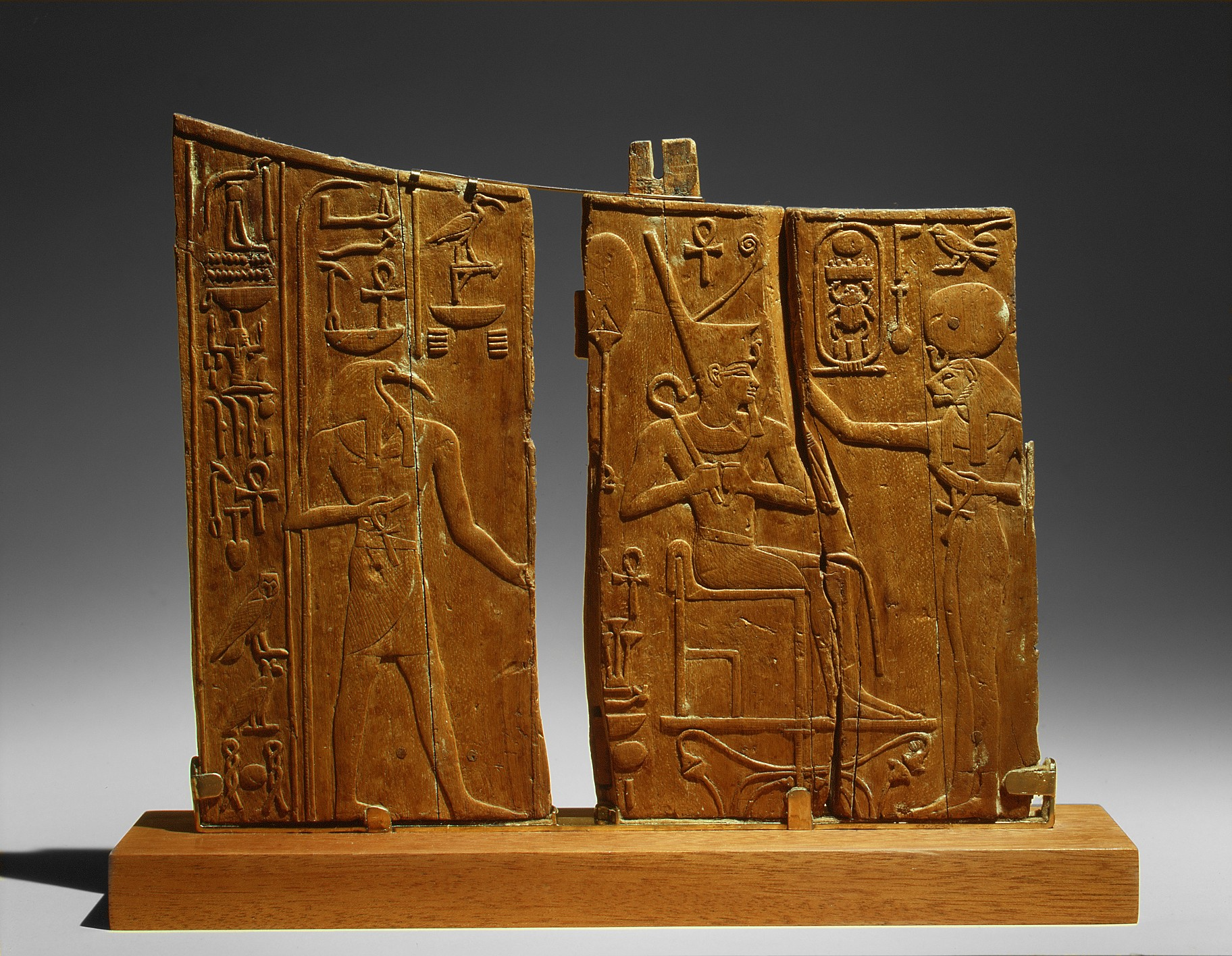
Arm panel from a ceremonial chair of Thutmose IV; 1400–1390 BC; wood (ficus sycomorus?); height: 25.1 cm; Metropolitan Museum of Art (New York City)

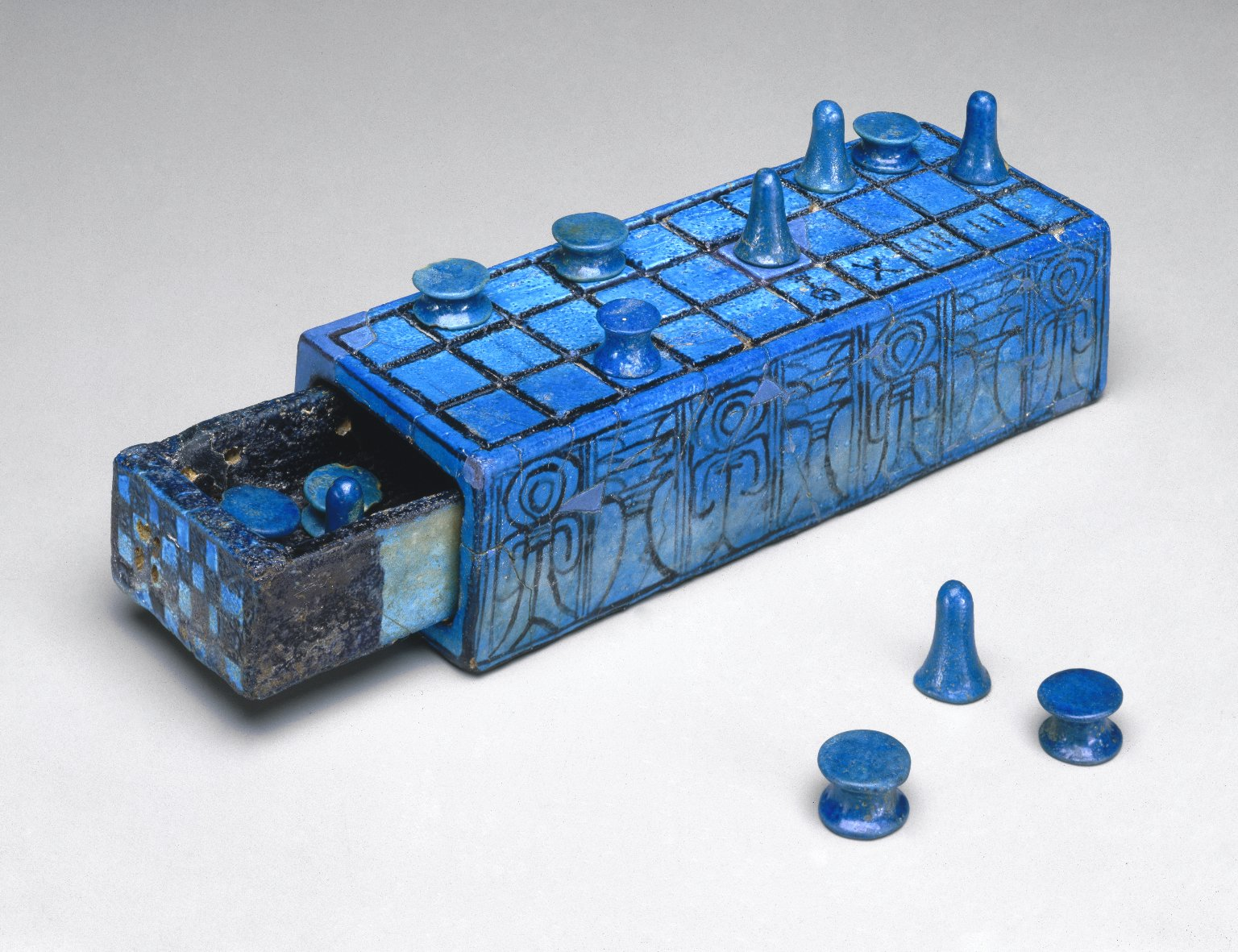
Gaming board inscribed for Amenhotep III with separate sliding drawer; 1390–1353 BC; glazed faience; 5.5 × 7.7 × 21 cm; Brooklyn Museum (New York City)

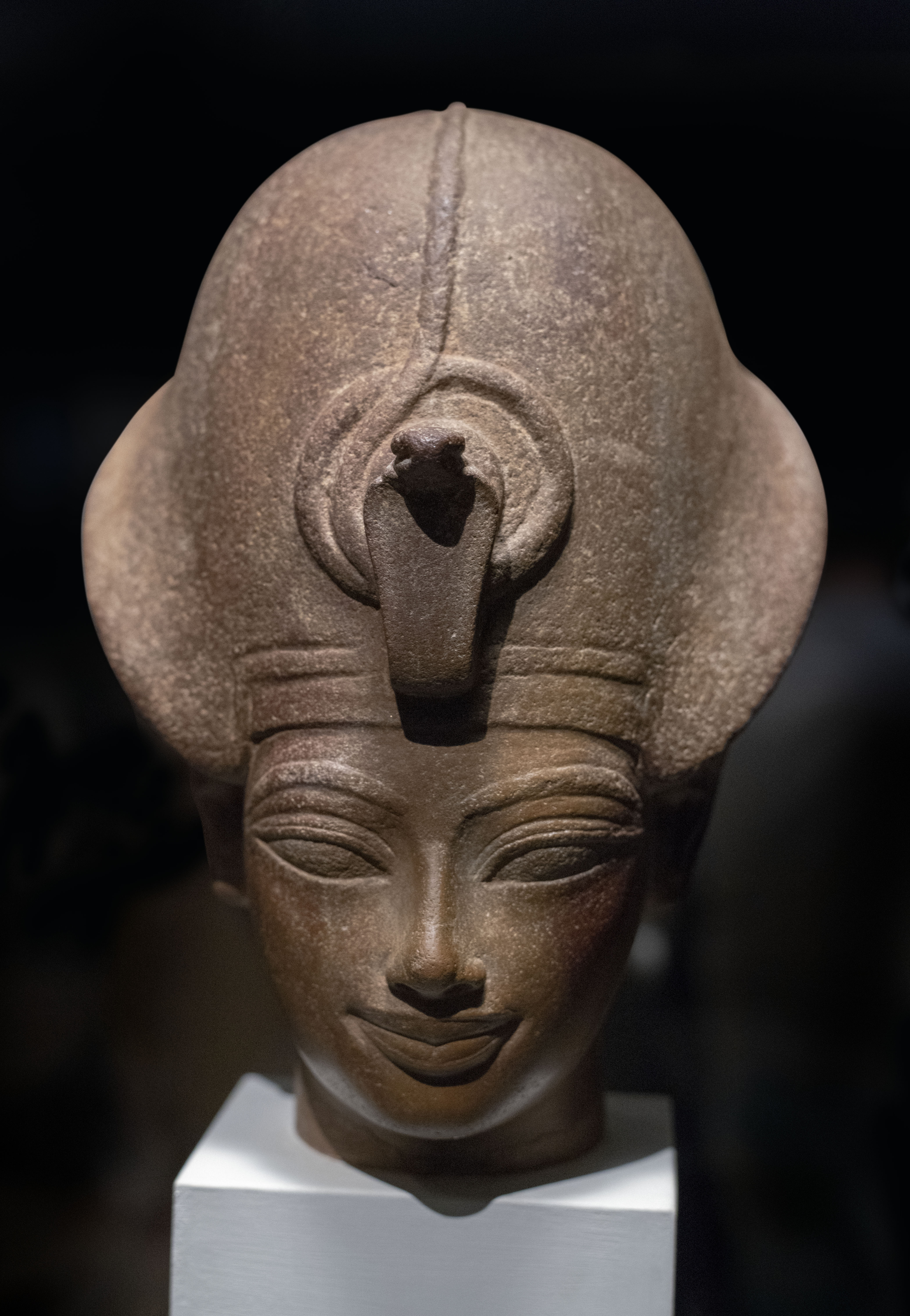
Head of Amenhotep III; 1390–1352 BC; quartzite; 24 × 20 cm, 9.8 kg; British Museum

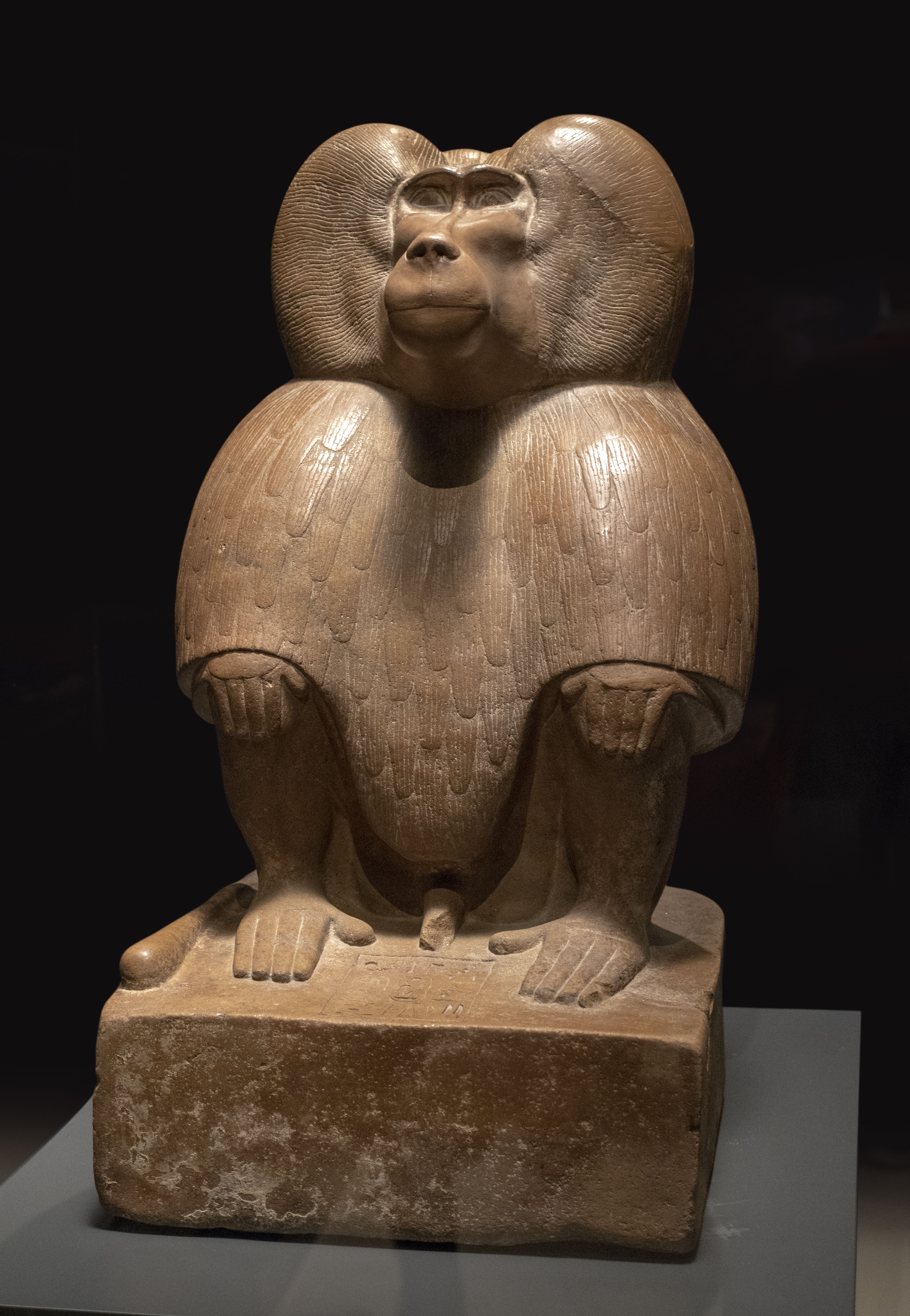
Baboon figurine; 1390–1352 BC; quartzite; 68.5 × 38.5 × 45 cm, 180 kg (estimated); British Museum

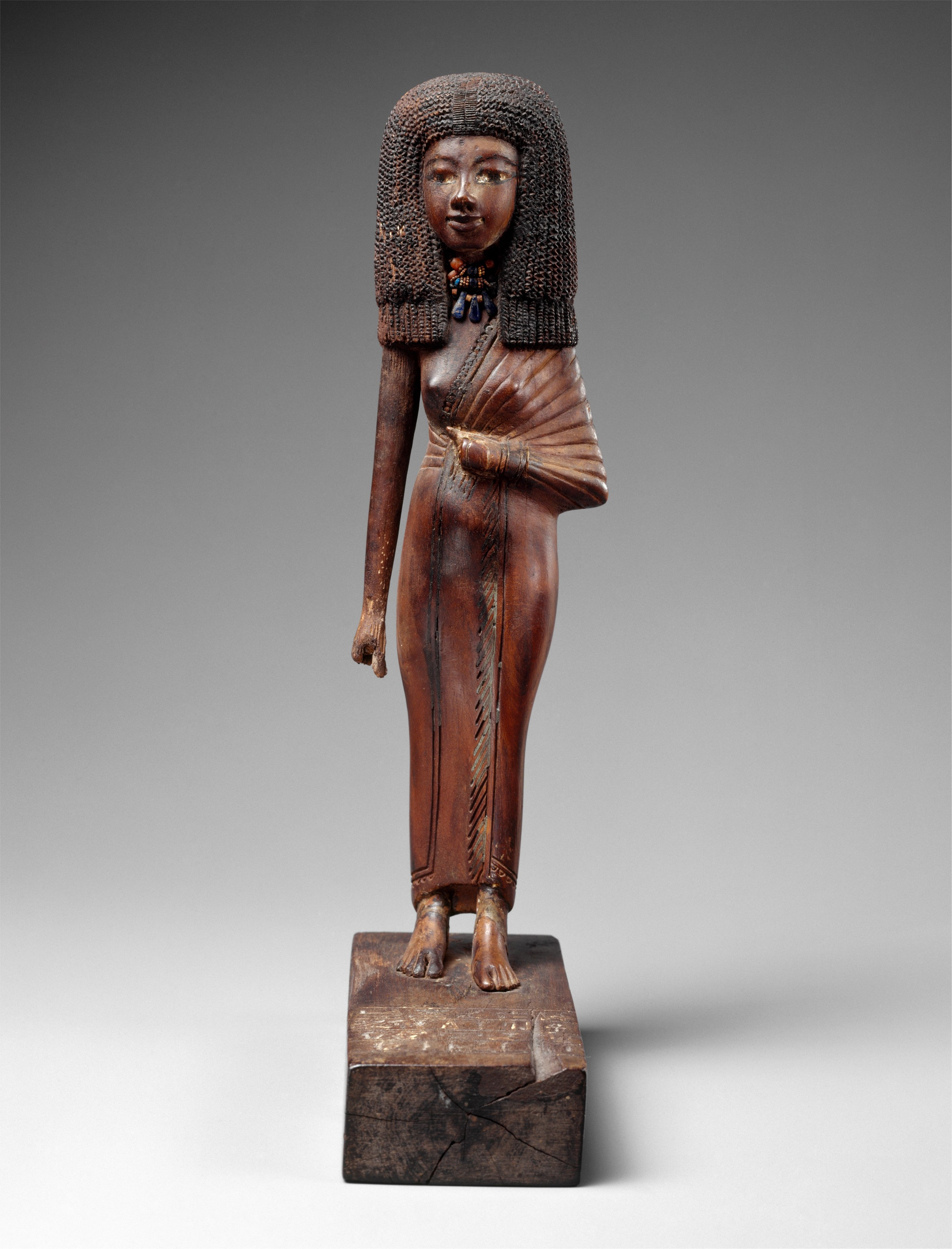
Statuette of the lady Tiye; 1390–1349 BC; wood, carnelian, gold, glass, Egyptian blue and paint; height: 24 cm; Metropolitan Museum of Art (New York City)

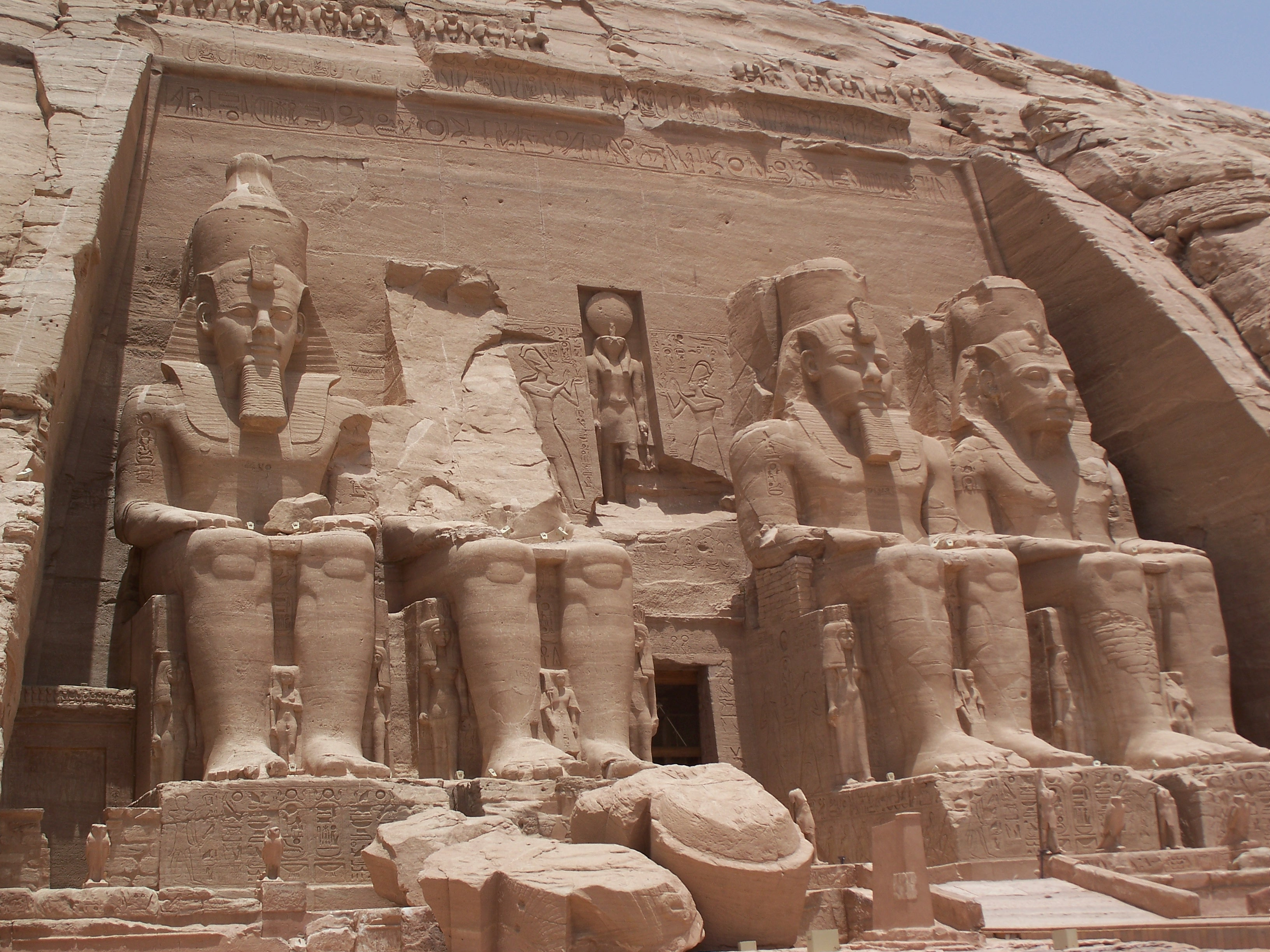
Abu Simbel, Temple of Ramesses II
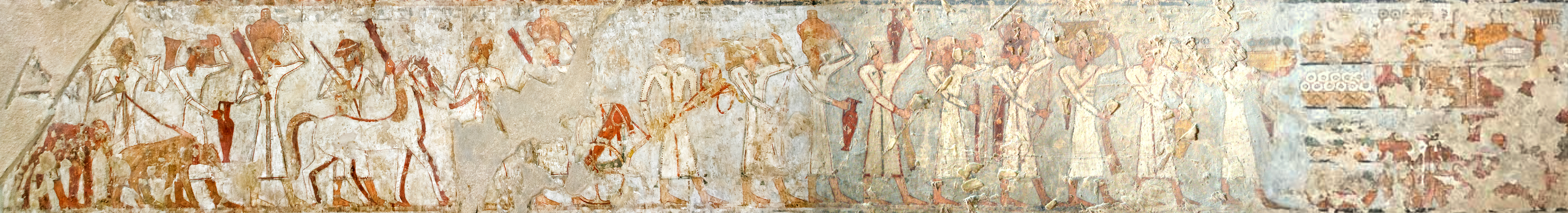
Syrians bringing presents to Tuthmosis III, in the tomb of Rekhmire, circa 1450 BC. They are labeled "Chiefs of Retjenu".

==== Amarna art (c. 1350 BC) ====
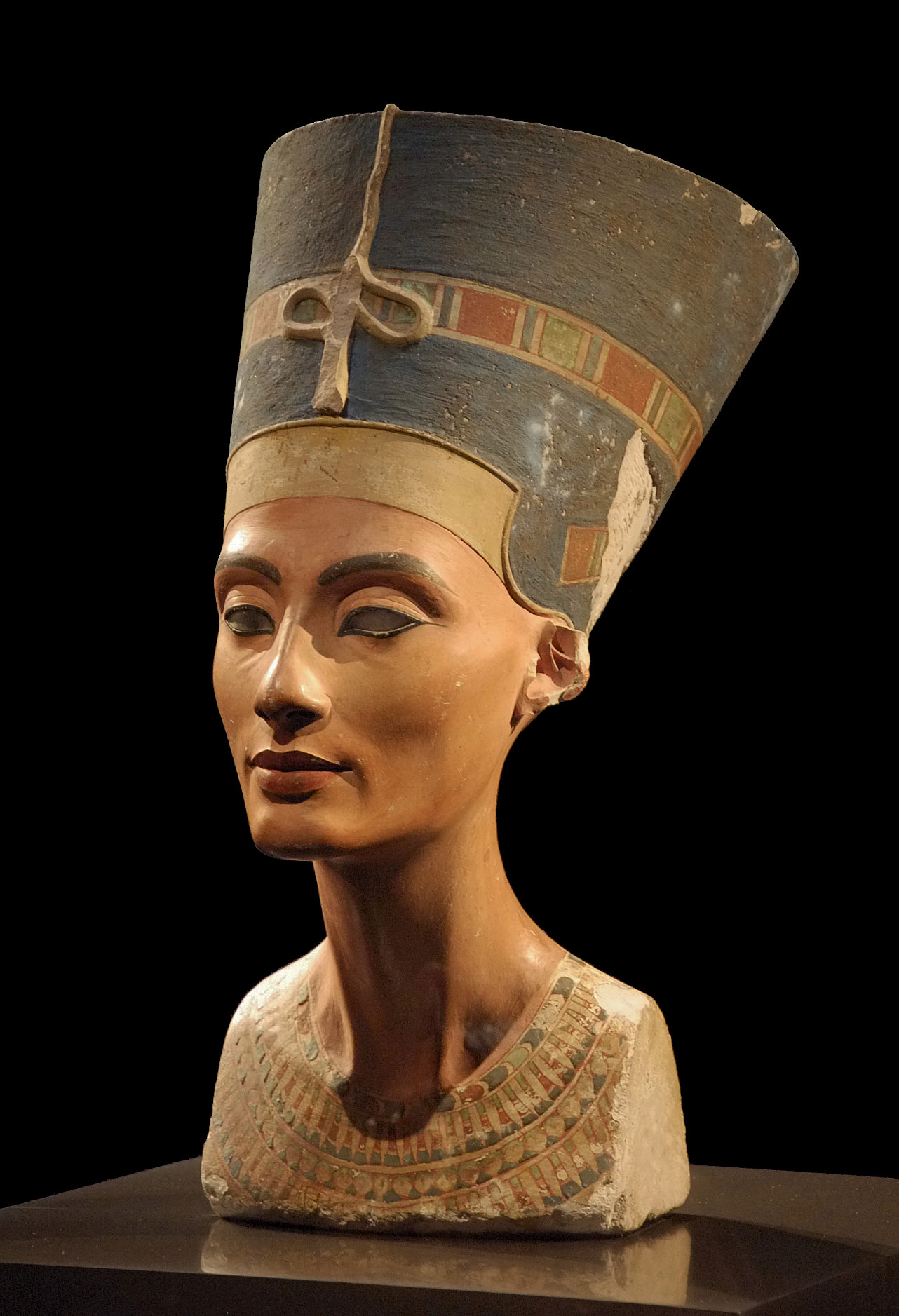
The Bust of Nefertiti; 1352–1336 BC; limestone, plaster & paint; height: 48 cm; from Amarna (Egypt); Egyptian Museum of Berlin (Germany)

Amarna art is named for the extensive archeological site at Tel el-Amarna, where Pharaoh Akhenaten moved the capital in the late Eighteenth Dynasty. This period, and the years leading up to it, constitute the most drastic interruption in the style of Egyptian art in the Old, Middle, and New Kingdoms as a result of the rising prominence of the New Solar Theology and the eventual shift towards Atenism under Akhenaten. Amarna art is characterized by a sense of movement and a "subjective and sensual perception" of reality as it appeared in the world. Scenes often include overlapping figures creating the sensation of a crowd, which was less common in earlier times.

The artwork produced under Akhenaten was a reflection of the dramatic changes in culture, style, and religion that occurred under Akhenaten's rule. Sometimes called the New Solar Theology, the new religion was a monotheistic worship of the sun, the Aten. Akhenaten emphasized himself as the "co-regent", along with the Aten, as well as the mouthpiece of the Aten himself. Since the sun disk was worshiped as the ultimate life-giving power in this new theology, anything the sun's rays touched was blessed by this force. As a result, sacrifices and worship were likely conducted in open courtyards, and the sunken relief technique, which works best for outdoor carvings, was also used for indoor works.

Portrayal of the human body shifted drastically under the reign of Akhenaten. For instance, many depictions of Akhenaten's body give him distinctly feminine qualities, such as large hips, prominent breasts, and a larger stomach and thighs. Facial representations of Akhenaten, such as in the sandstone Statue of Akhenaten, display him with an elongated chin, full lips, and hollow cheeks. These stylistic features extended past representations of Akhenaten and were further employed in the depiction of all figures of the royal family, as observed in the Portrait of Meritaten and Fragment of a queen's face. This is a divergence from the earlier Egyptian art, which emphasized idealized youth and masculinity for male figures.

A notable innovation from the reign of Akhenaten was the religious elevation of the royal family, including Akhenaten's wife, Nefertiti, and their three daughters. While earlier periods of Egyptian art depicted the king as the primary link between humanity and the gods, the Amarna period extended this power to those of the royal family. As visualized in the relief of a royal family and the different talatat blocks, each figure of the royal family is touched by the rays of the Aten. Nefertiti specifically is believed to have held a significant cultic role during this period.

Not many buildings from this period have survived, partially as they were constructed with standard-sized blocks, known as talatat, which were very easy to remove and reuse. Temples in Amarna, following the trend, did not follow traditional Egyptian customs and were open, without ceilings, and had no closing doors. In the generations after Akhenaten's death, artists reverted to the traditional Egyptian styles of earlier periods. There were still traces of this period's style in later art, but in most respects, Egyptian art, like Egyptian religion, resumed its usual characteristics as though the period had never happened. Amarna itself was abandoned and considerable effort was undertaken to deface monuments from the reign, including disassembling buildings and reusing the blocks with their decoration facing inwards, as has recently been discovered in one later building. The last King of the Eighteenth Dynasty, Horemheb, sought to eliminate the influence of Amarna art and culture and reinstate the tradition powerful of the cult of Amun.

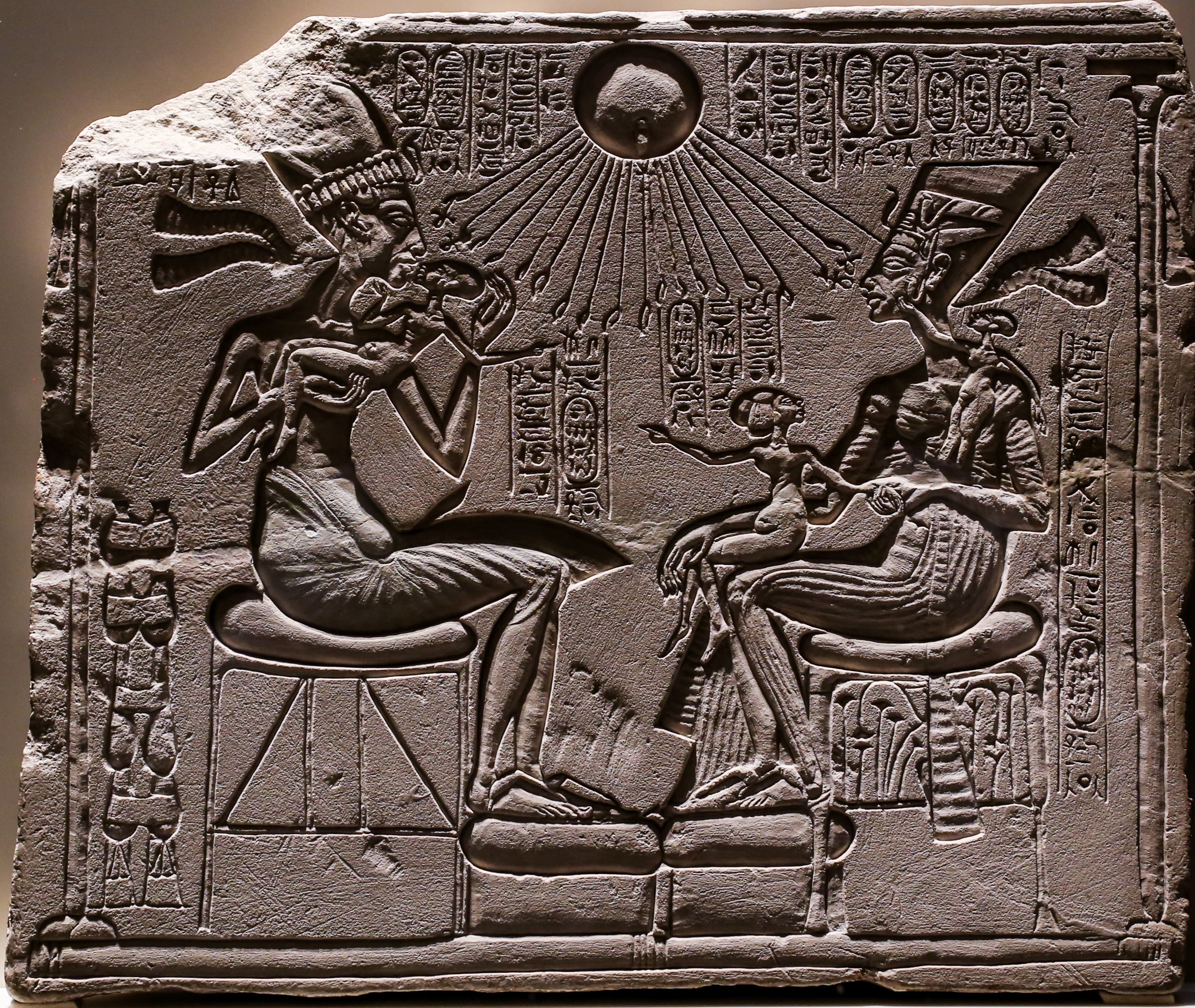
Relief of the royal family: Akhenaten, Nefertiti and the three daughters; 1352–1336 BC; painted limestone; 25 × 20 cm; Egyptian Museum of Berlin (Germany)

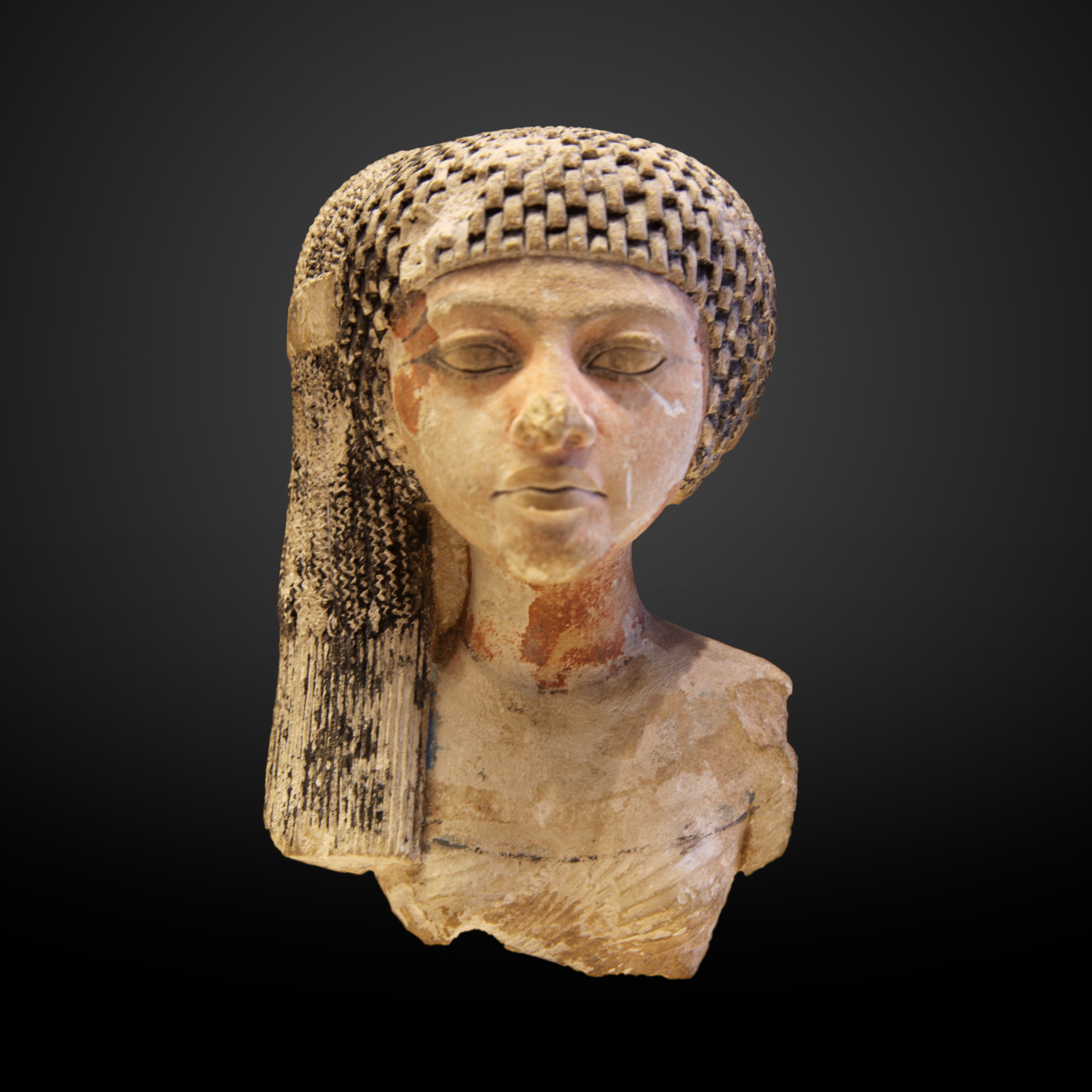
Portrait of Meritaten; 1351–1332 BC; painted limestone; height: 15.4 cm; Louvre

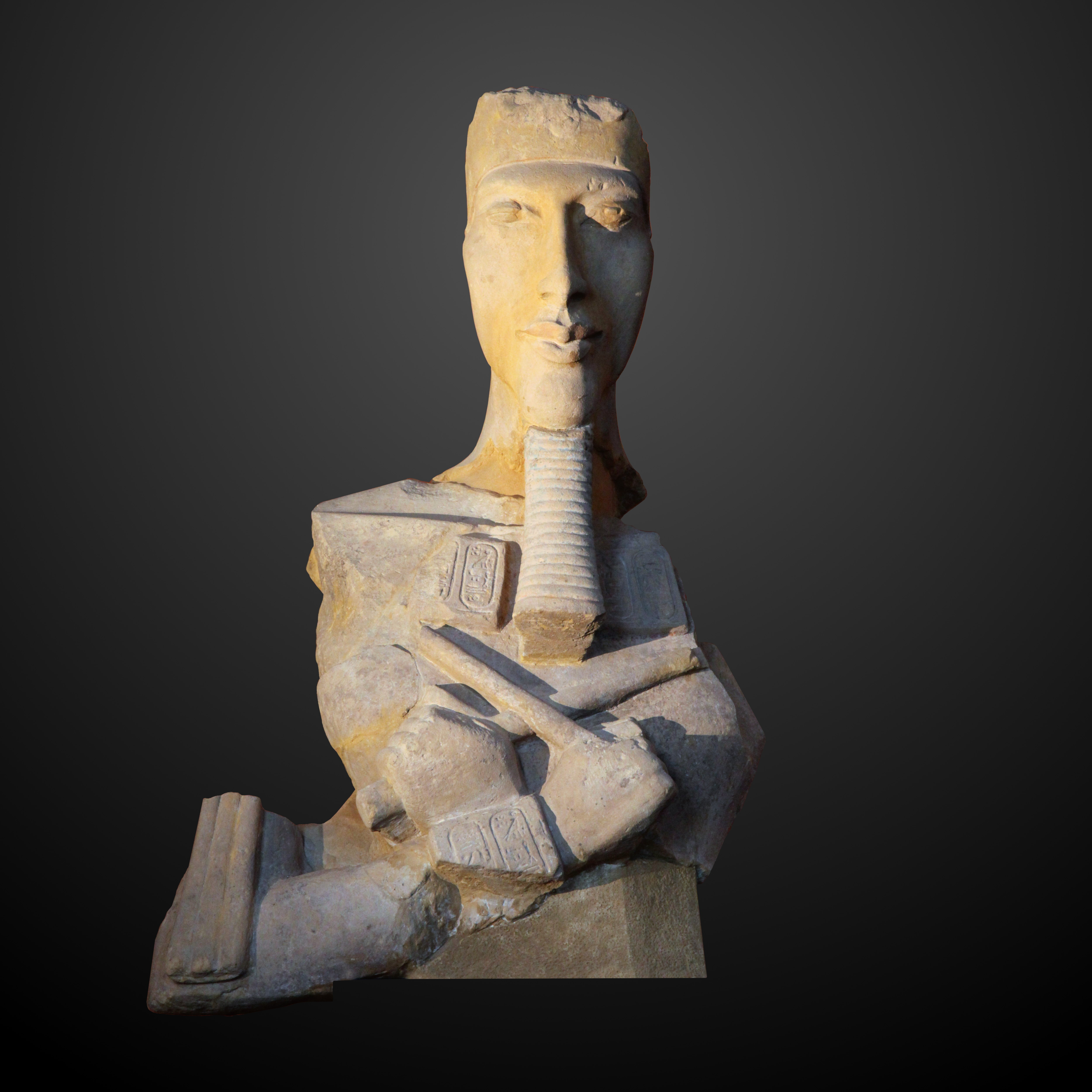
Statue of Akhenaten; c. 1350 BC; painted sandstone; 1.3 × 0.8 × 0.6 m; Louvre

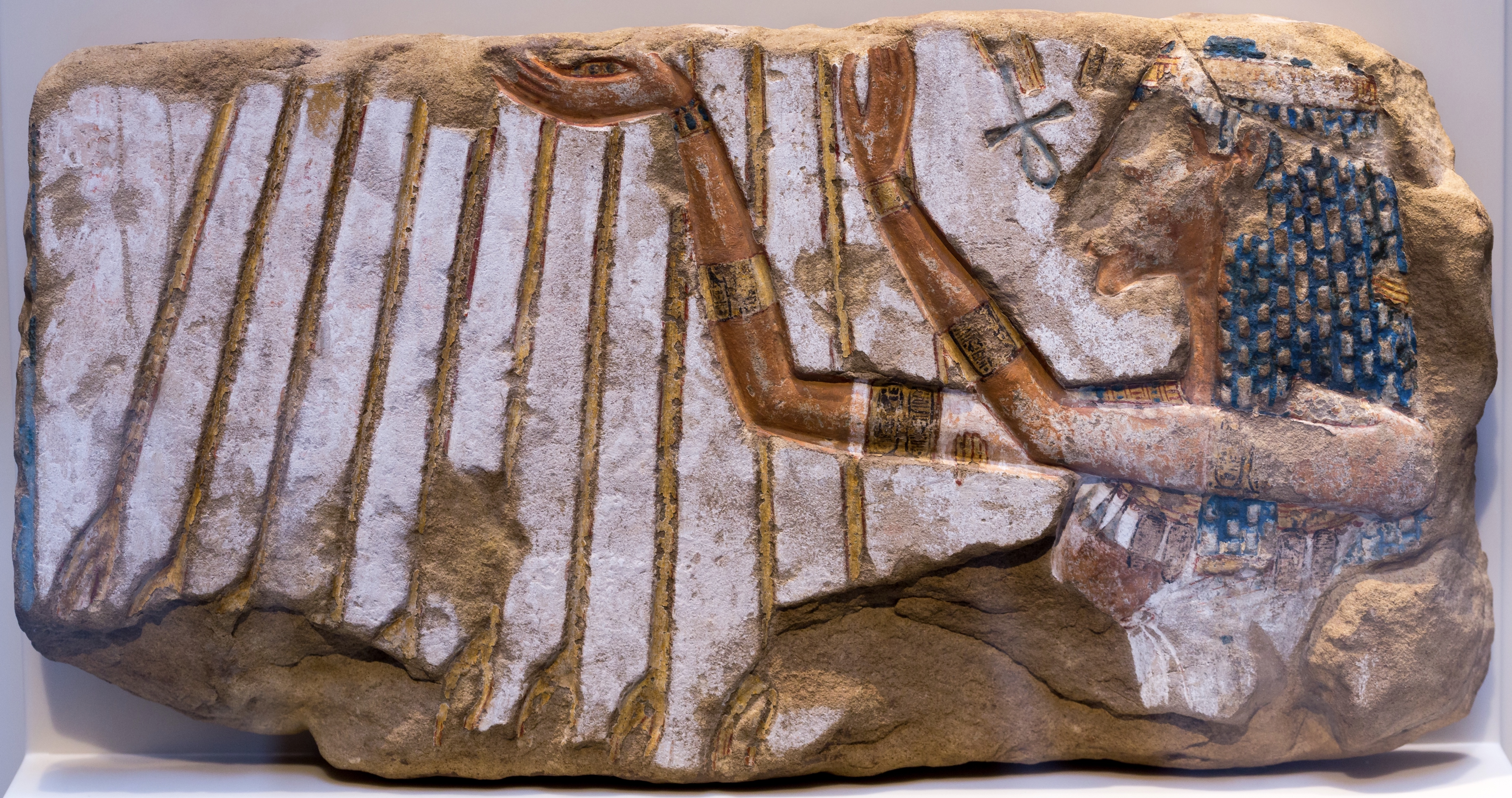
Talatat block with relief showing Nefertiti at prayer; circa 1350 BC; painted sandstone; height: 23.4 cm; from Karnak; Egyptian Museum of Berlin

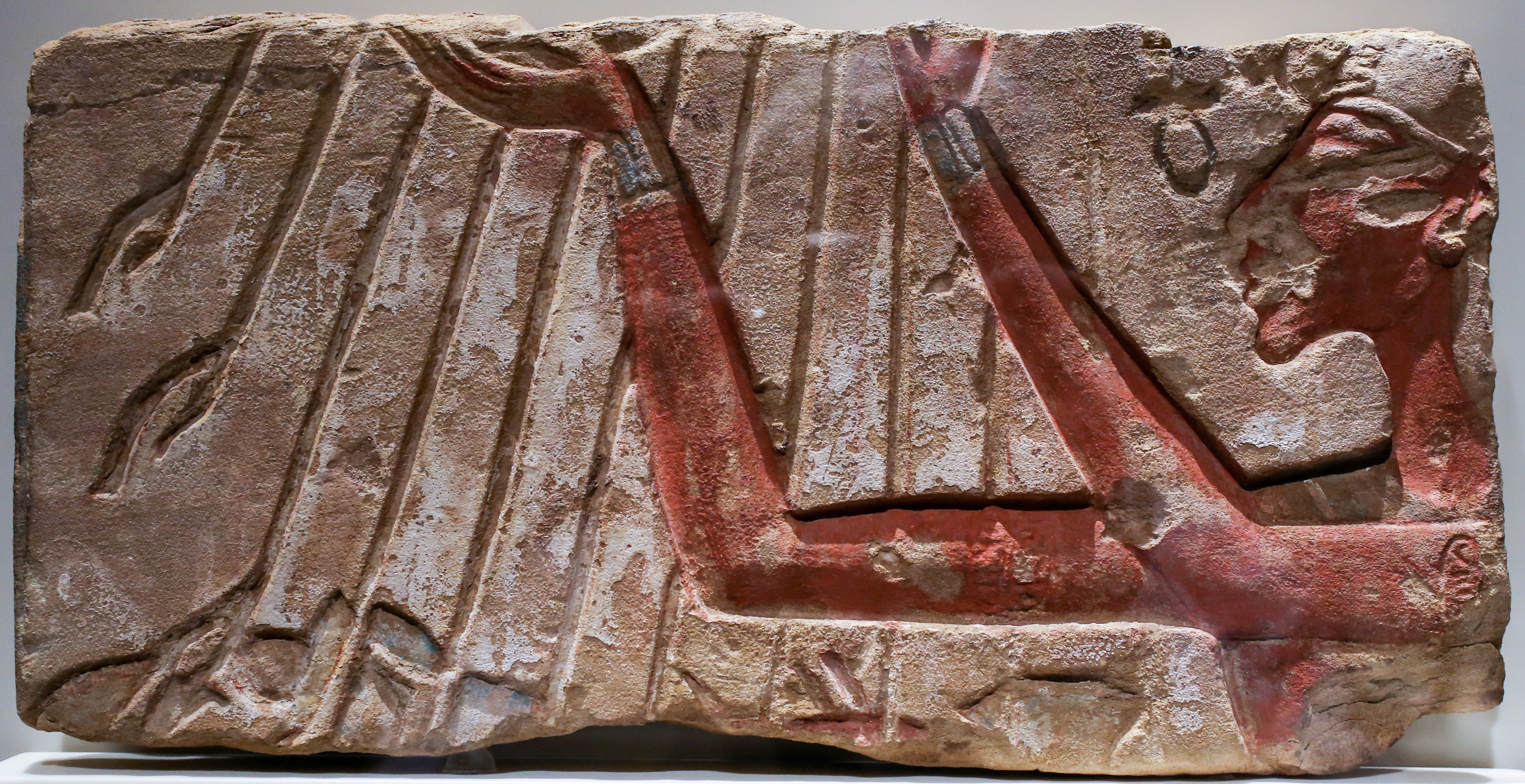
Talatat block with Akhenaton standing to the right, raising his hands in prayer to the rays of the sun god Aten; circa 1350 BC; painted sandstone; from Karnak; Egyptian Museum of Berlin

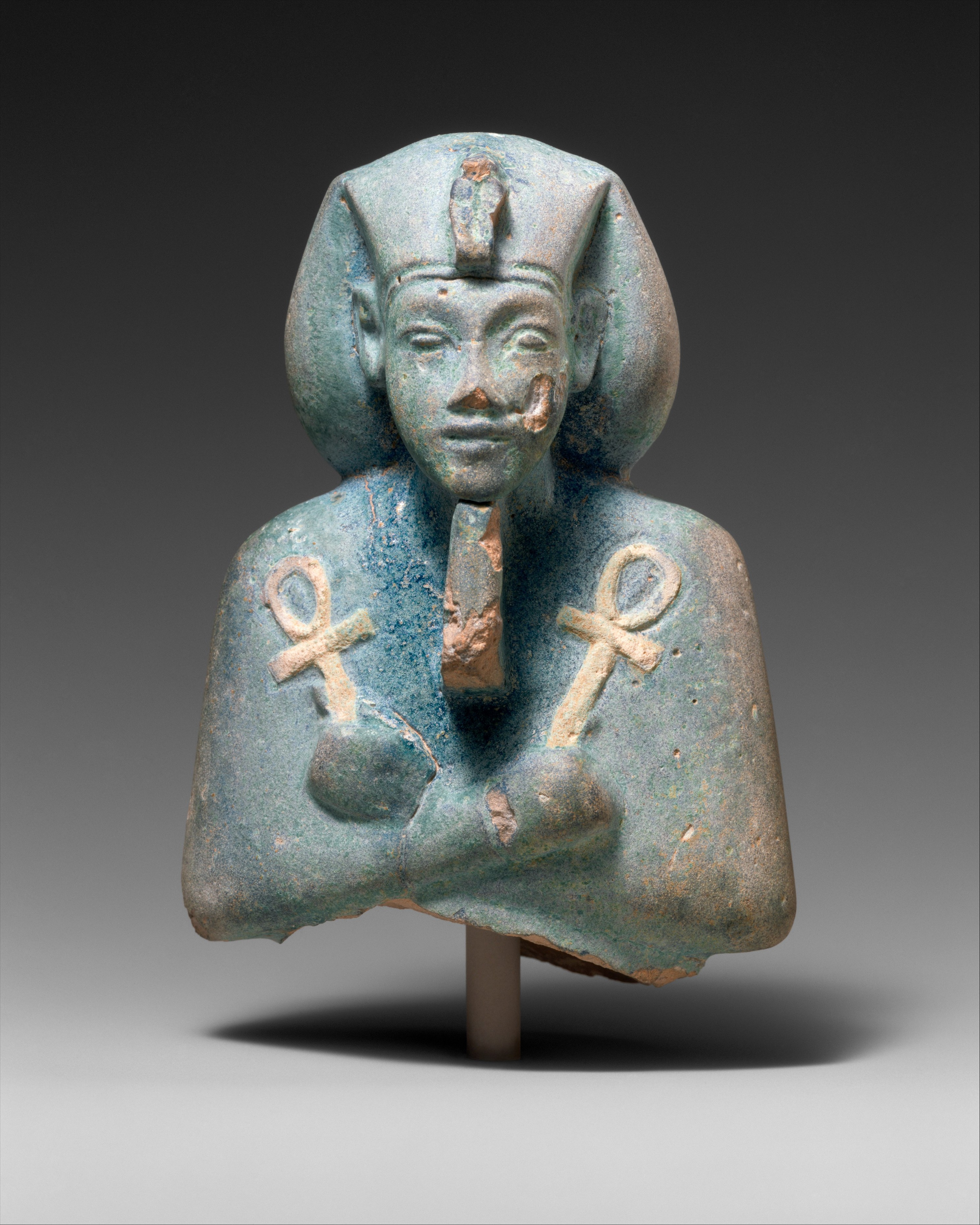
Shabti of Akhenaten; 1353–1336 BC; faience; height: 11 cm, width: 7.6 cm, depth: 5.2 cm; Metropolitan Museum of Art (New York City)

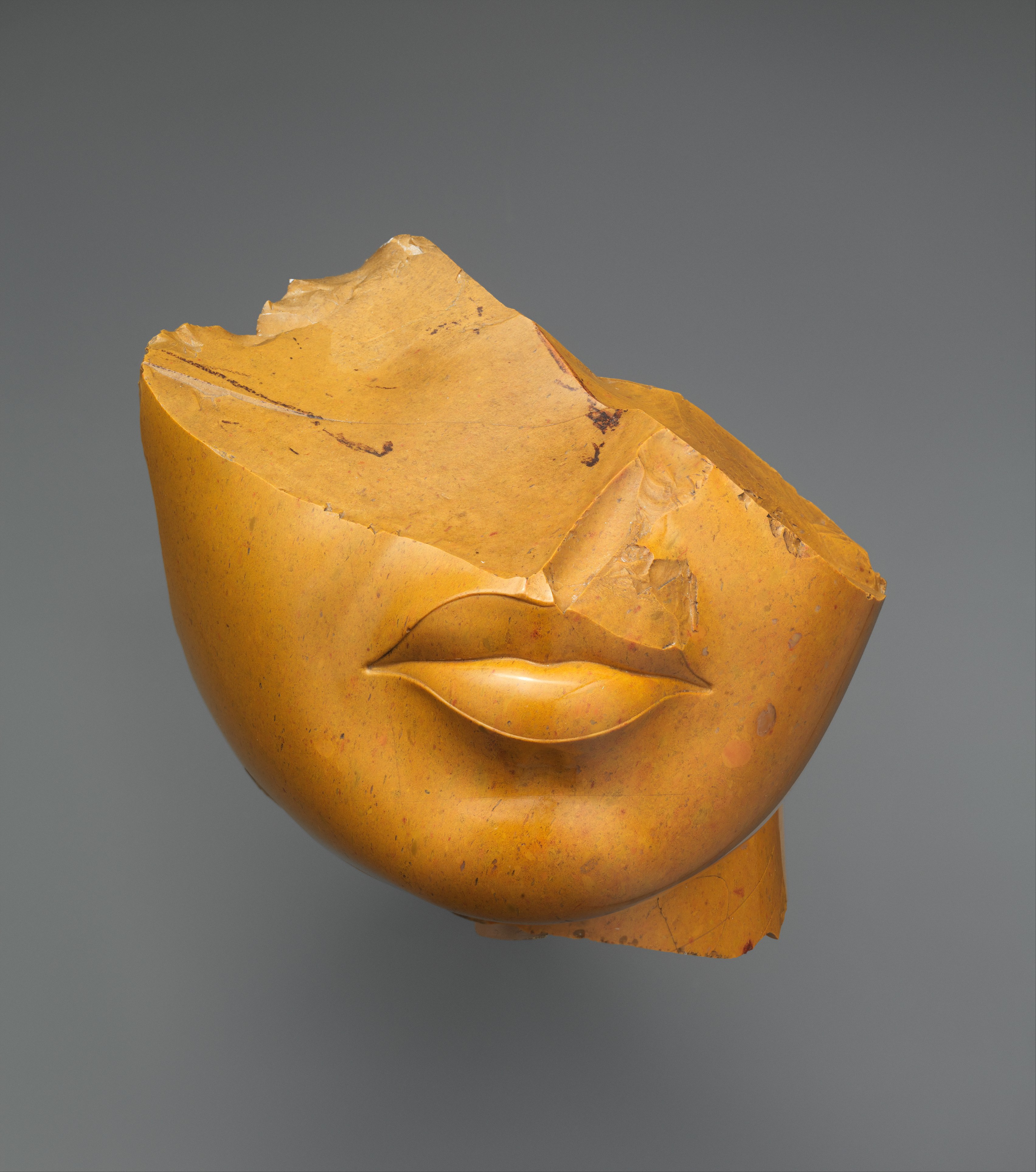
Fragment of a queen's face; 1353–1336 BC; yellow jasper; height: 13 cm, width: 12.5 cm, depth: 12.5 cm; Metropolitan Museum of Art

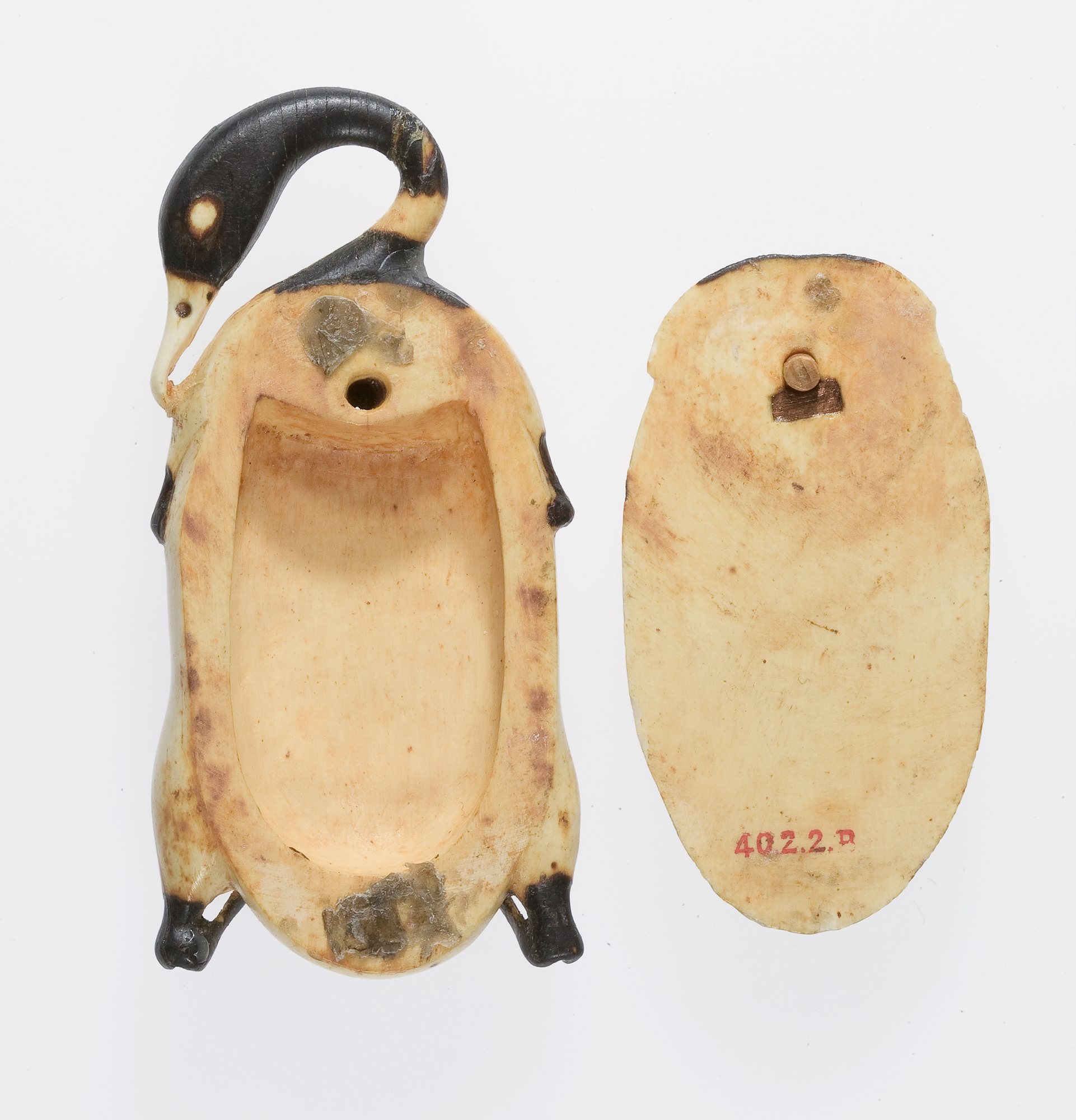
Cosmetic dish in the shape of a trussed duck; 1353–1327 BC; hippopotamus ivory (tinted); duck (left), length: 9.5 cm, width: 4.6 cm; cover (right), length: 7.3 cm, width: 4 cm; Metropolitan Museum of Art

===== Ramesside Period (c.1209-1077 BC) =====
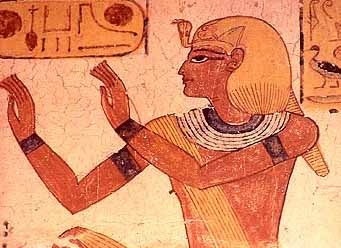
Portrait of Ramesses IX (ruled 1129–1111 BC), from his tomb KV6. 20th Dynasty.

With a concerted effort from Horemheb, the last King of Dynasty Eighteen, to eradicate all Amarna art and influence, the style of the art and architecture of the Empire transitioned into the Ramesside Period for the remainder of the New Kingdom (Nineteen and Twentieth Dynasties). In response to the religious and artistic revolution of the Amarna period, state-commissioned works demonstrate a clear return to tradition forms and renewed dedication to Amun-ra. However, some elements of Amarna bodily proportion persist; the small of the back does not move back to its lower, Middle Kingdom, height and human limbs remain somewhat elongated. With some modifications, 19th and 20th Dynasty Kings continued to build their funerary temples, which were dedicated to Amun-ra and located in Thebes, in their predecessors' style. The Ramses Kings also continued to build colossal statues such as those commissioned by Hatshepsut.

During the Ramesside period kings made further contributions to the Temple at Karnak. The Great Hypostyle Hall, commissioned by Sety I (19th Dynasty), consisted of 134 sandstone columns supporting a 20-meter-high ceiling, and covering an acre of land. Sety I decorated most surfaces with intricate bas-relief while his successor, Ramses II added sunken relief work to the walls and columns in the southern side of the Great Hall. The interior carvings show king-god interactions, such as traditional legitimization of power scenes, processions, and rituals. Expansive depictions of military campaigns cover the exterior walls of Hypostyle Hall. Battle scenes illustrating chaotic, disordered enemies strewn over the conquered land and the victorious king as the most prominent figure, trademark the Ramesside period.

The last period of the New Kingdom demonstrates a return to traditional Egyptian form and style, but the culture is not purely a reversion to the past. The art of the Ramesside period demonstrates the integration of canonized Egypt forms with modern innovations and materials. Advancements such as adorning all surfaces of tombs with paintings and relief and the addition of new funerary texts to burial chambers demonstrate the non-static nature of this period.

=== Third Intermediate Period (c. 1069–664 BC) ===
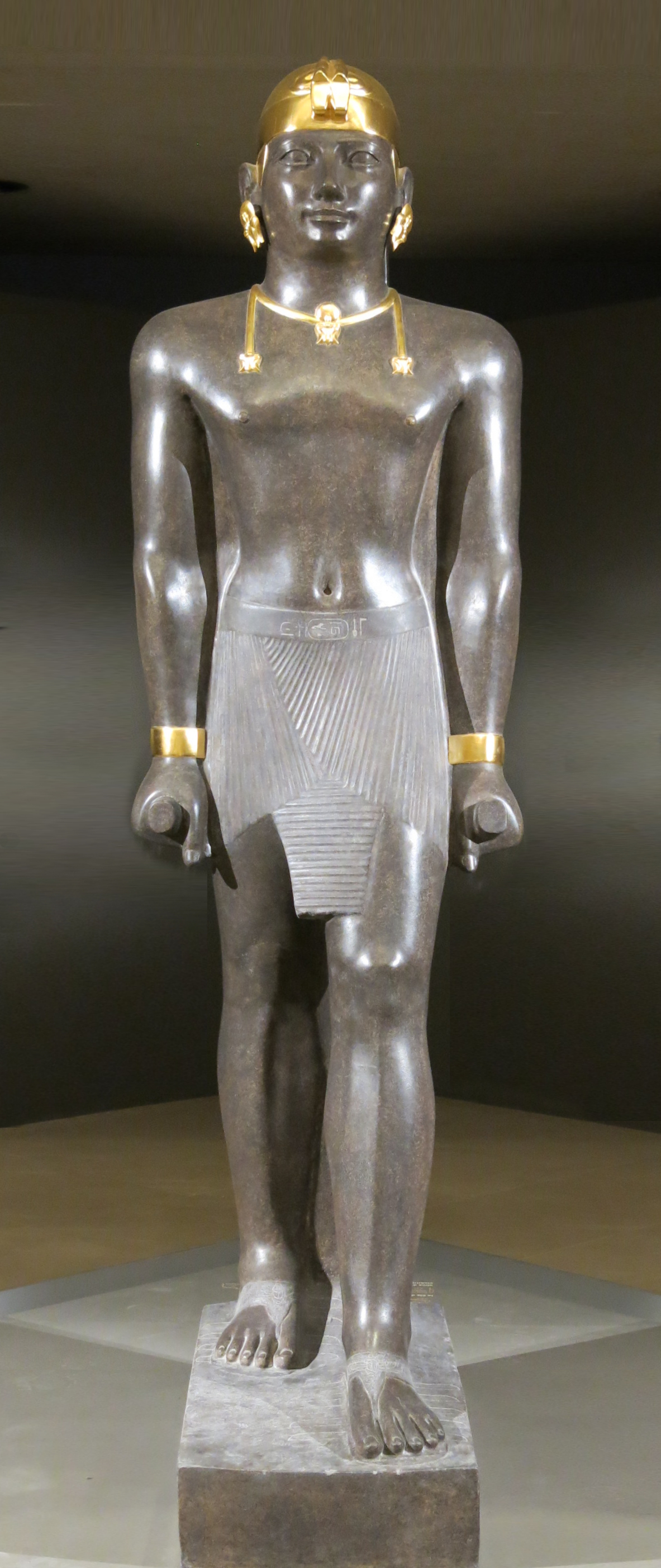
Taharqa

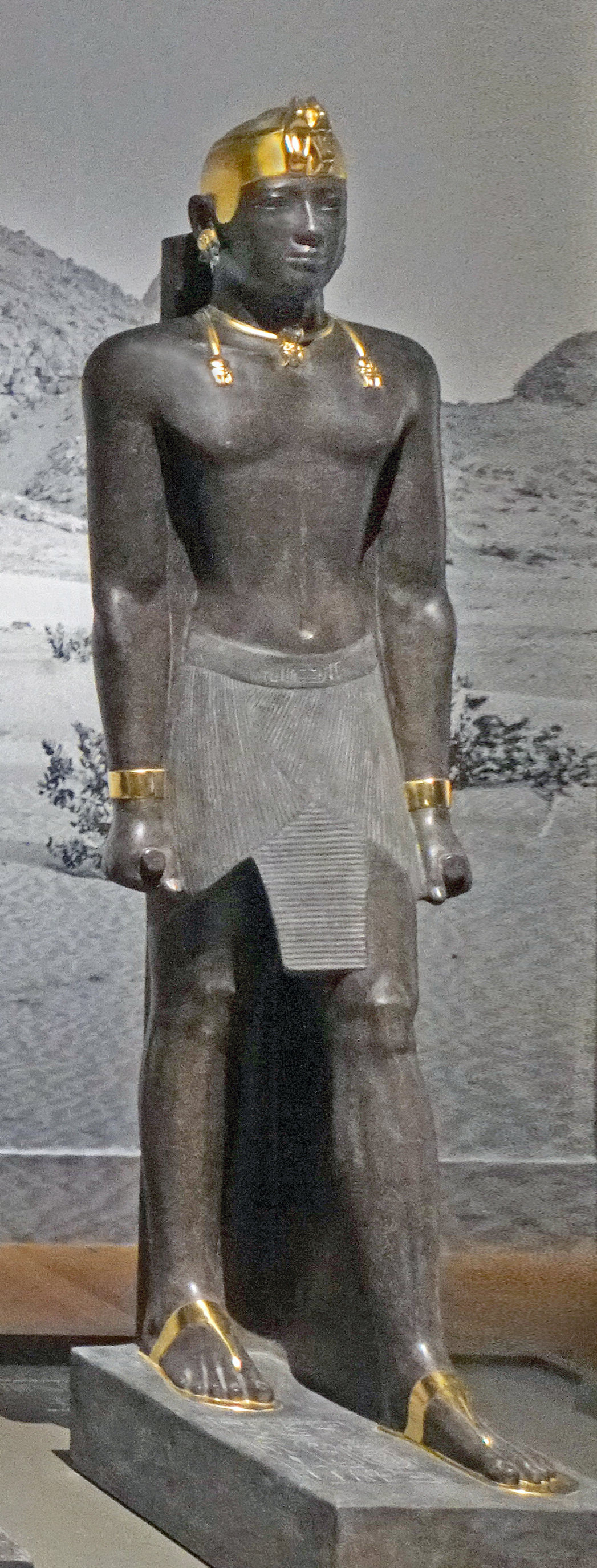
Tantamani

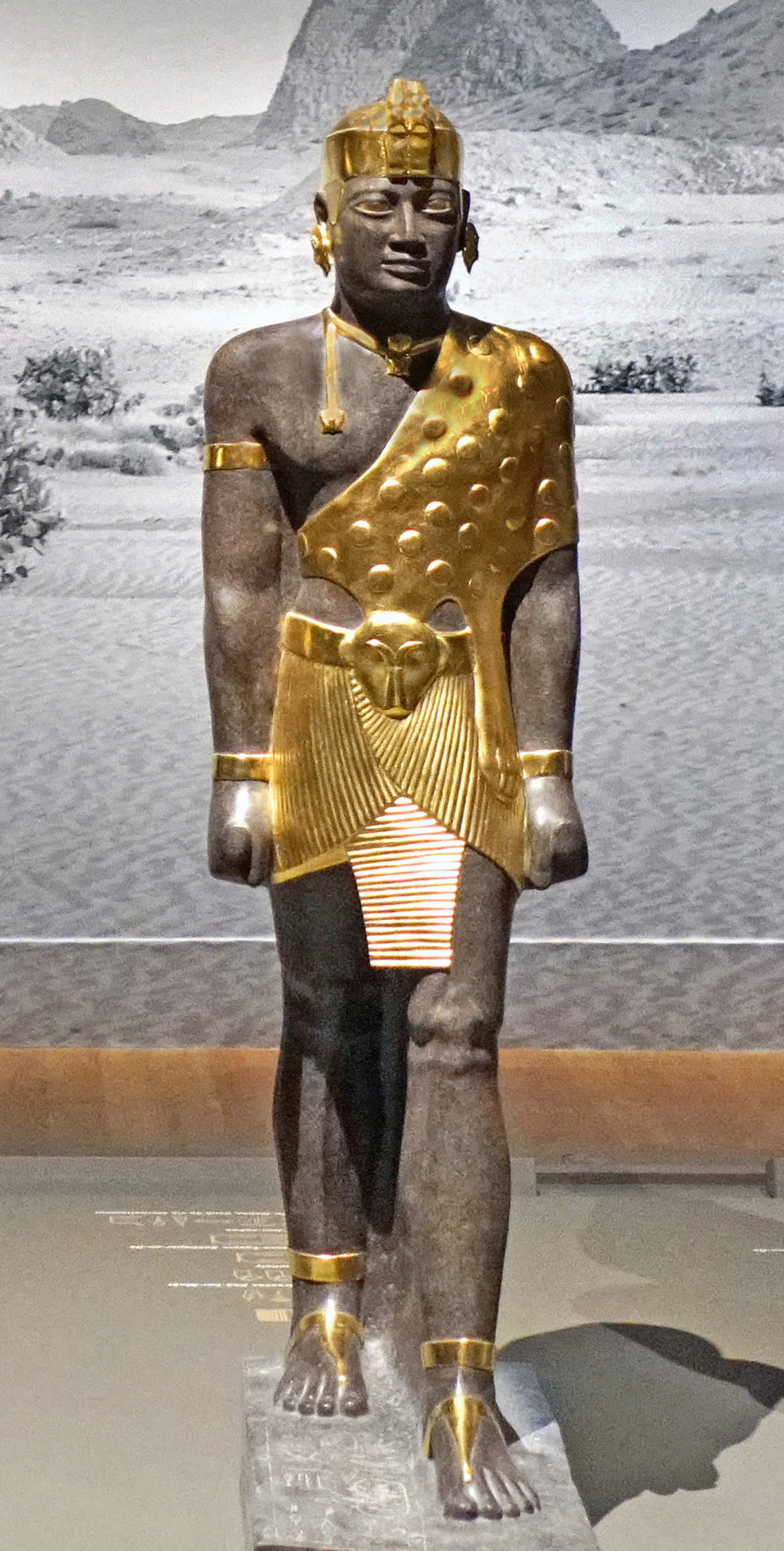
Senkamanisken

Statues of the "Black Pharaohs" (rulers of the 25th Dynasty and the Kingdom of Kush), in the Louvre Museum (golden colors reconstructed through color pigment analysis)

The Third Intermediate Period was one of decline and political instability, coinciding with the Late Bronze Age collapse of civilizations in the Near East and Eastern Mediterranean (including the Greek Dark Ages). It was marked by division of the state for much of the period and conquest and rule by foreigners. After an early period of fracturation, the country was firmly reunited by the Twenty-second Dynasty founded by Shoshenq I in 945 BC (or 943 BC), who descended from Meshwesh immigrants, originally from Ancient Libya. The next period of the Twenty-fourth Dynasty saw the increasing influence of the Nubian kingdom to the south took full advantage of this division and the ensuing political instability. Then around 732 BC, Piye, marched north and defeated the combined might of several native Egyptian rulers: Peftjaubast, Osorkon IV of Tanis, Iuput II of Leontopolis and Tefnakht of Sais. He established the Twenty-fifth Dynasty of "Black Pharaos" originating from Nubia.

The Third Intermediate Period generally sees a return to archaic Egyptian styles, with particular reference to the art of the Old and Middle Kingdom. The art of the period essentially consists in traditional Egyptian styles, reintroduced for unknown reasons as early as Shoshenq V or Osorkon III, sometimes with the inclusion of some foreign characteristics, such as the particular iconography of the statues of the Nubian rulers of the Twenty-fifth Dynasty. Although the Twenty-fifth Dynasty controlled Ancient Egypt for only 73 years, it holds an important place in Egyptian history due to the restoration of traditional Egyptian values, culture, art, and architecture, combined with some original creations such as the monumental column of Taharqa in Karnak. During the 25th dynasty Egypt was ruled from Napata in Nubia, now in modern Sudan, and the Dynasty in turn permitted the expansion of Egyptian architectural styles to Lower Egypt and Nubia.

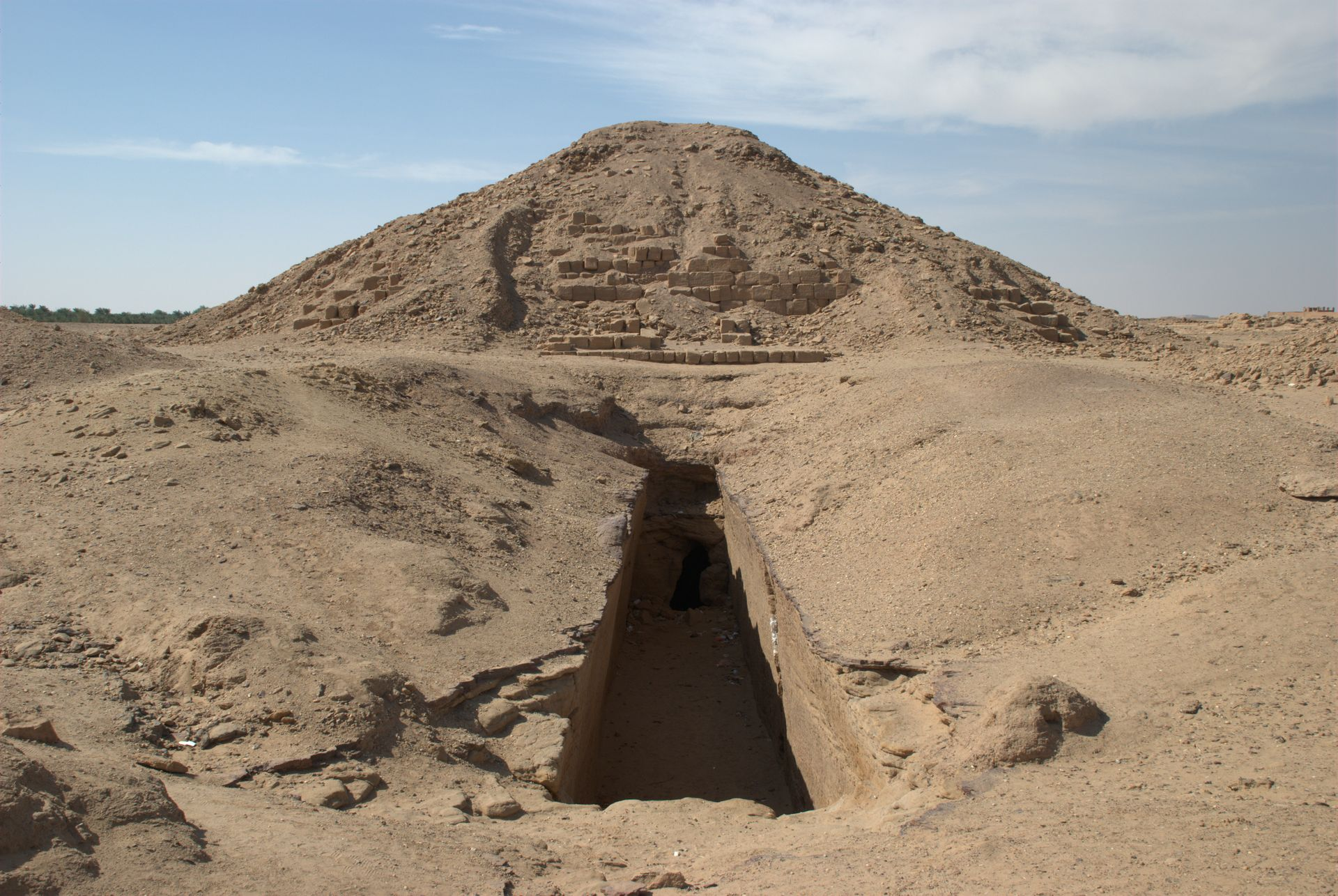
Pyramid of Piye, a Nubian king who conquered Upper Egypt and brought it under his control, at El-Kurru (Sudan)

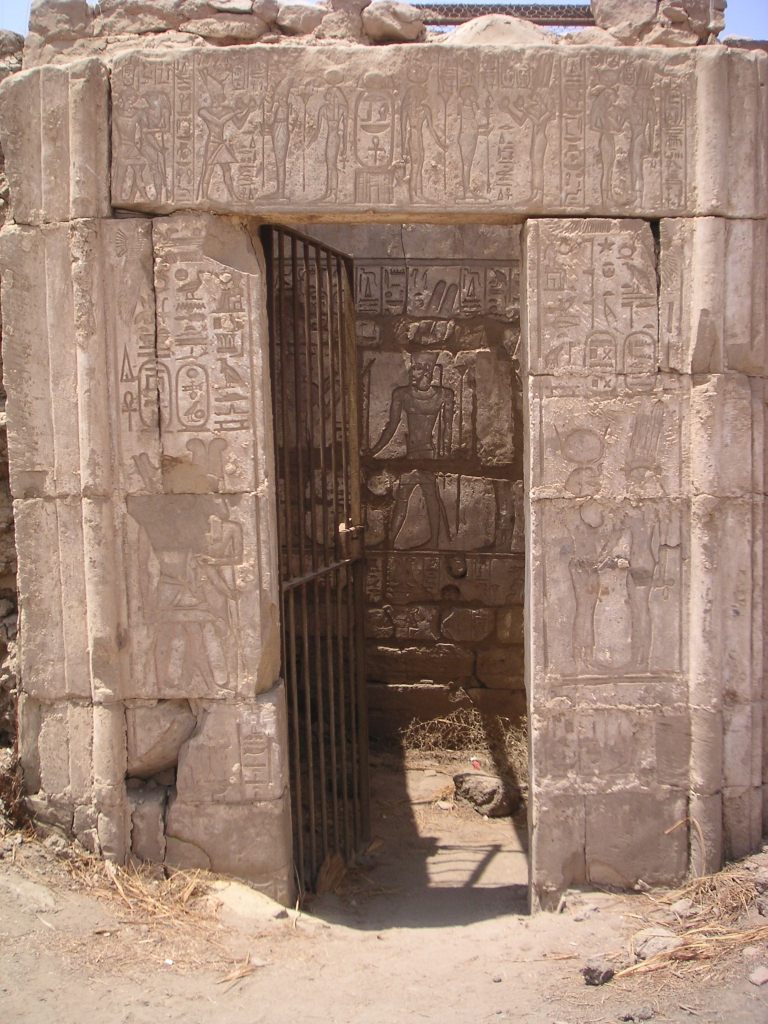
Chapel of the "Black Pharaoh" Taharqa and his sister Shepenupet II in Karnak

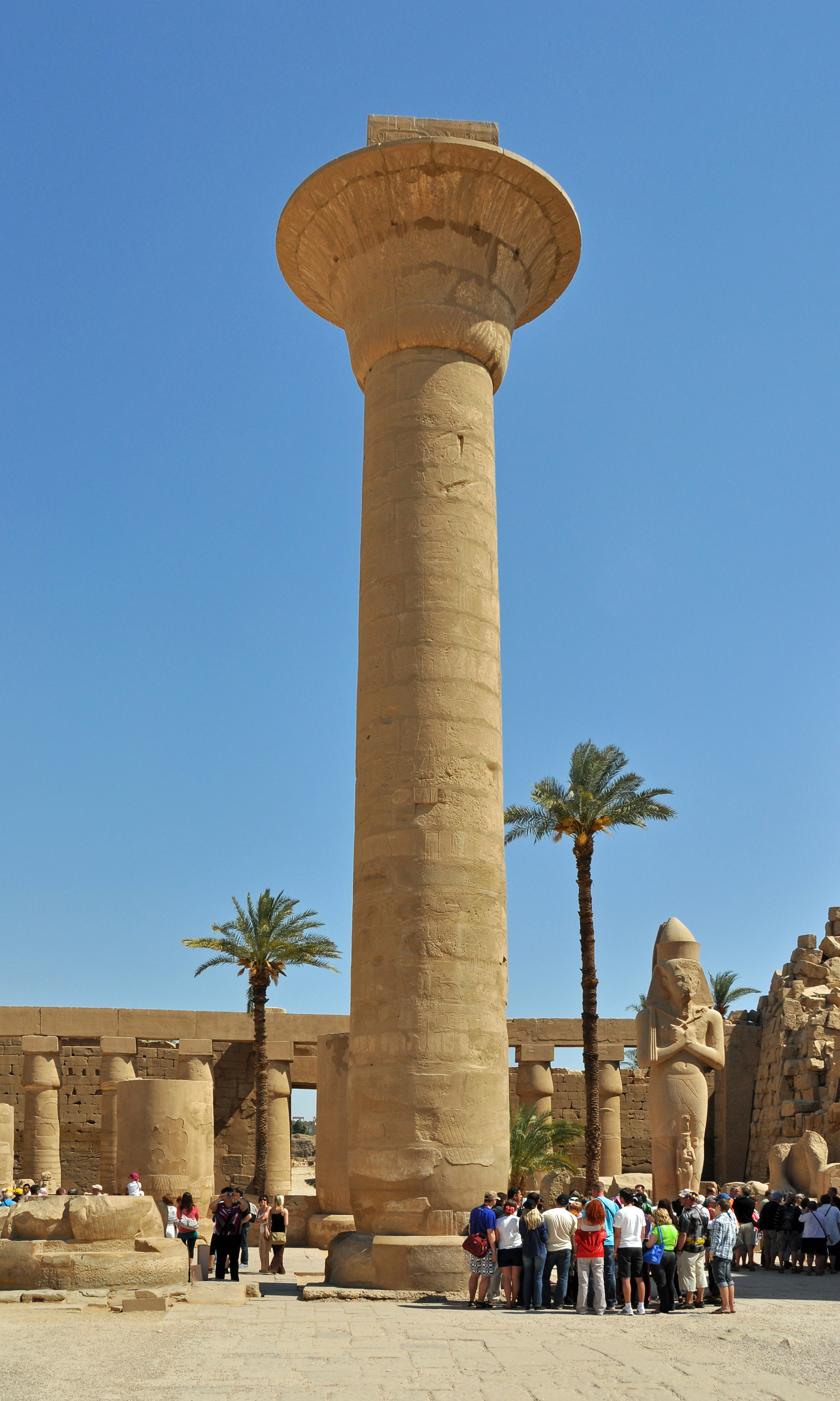
Monumental column elevated by the "Black Pharaoh" Taharqa in Karnak

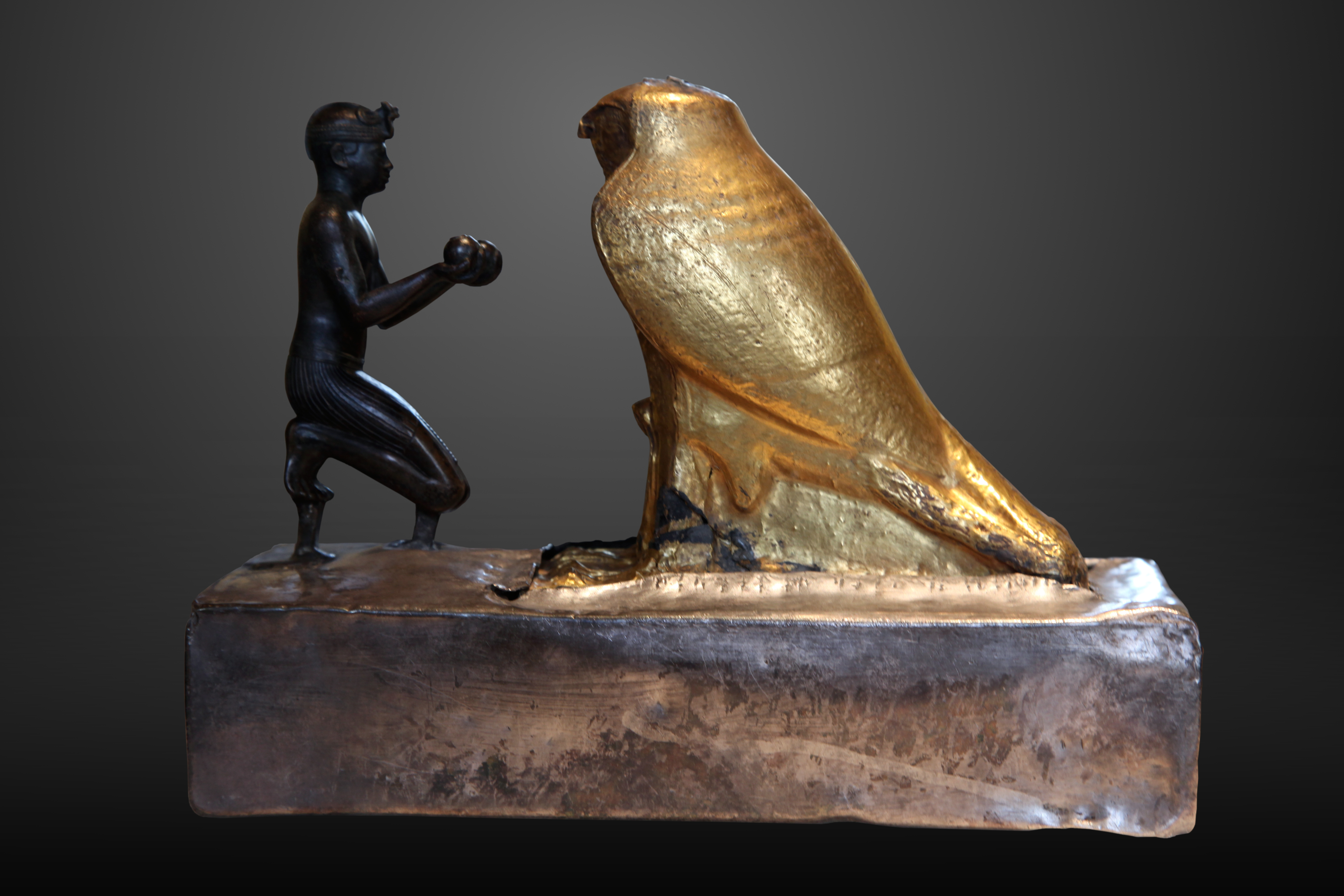
Taharqa offering wine jars to Falcon-god Hemen; 690–664 BC; bronze, greywacke, gold and wood; length: 26 cm, height: 19.7 cm, width: 10.3 cm; Louvre

=== Late Period (c. 664–332 BC) ===
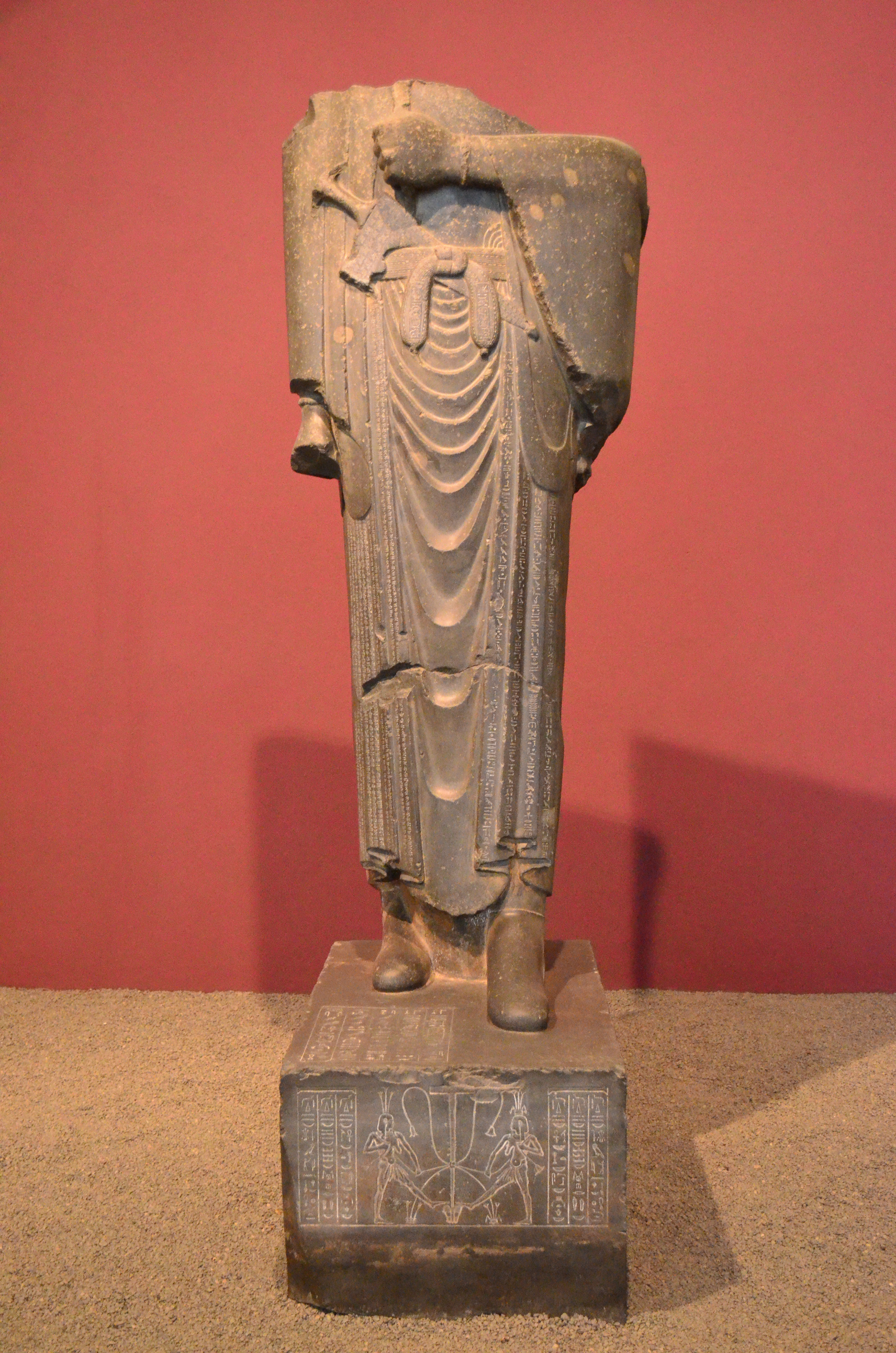
Egyptian statue of Achaemenid Emperor Darius I, as Pharaoh of the Twenty-seventh Dynasty of Egypt; 522–486 BC; greywacke; height: 2.46 m; National Museum of Iran (Teheran)

In 525 BC, the political state of Egypt was taken over by the Persians, almost a century and a half into Egypt's Late Period. By 404 BC, the Persians were expelled from Egypt, starting a short period of independence. These 60 years of Egyptian rule were marked by an abundance of usurpers and short reigns. The Egyptians were then reoccupied by the Achaemenids until 332 BC with the arrival of Alexander the Great. Sources state that the Egyptians were cheering when Alexander entered the capital since he drove out the immensely disliked Persians. The Late Period is marked with the death of Alexander the Great and the start of the Ptolemaic dynasty. Although this period marks political turbulence and immense change for Egypt, its art and culture continued to flourish.

This can be seen in Egyptian temples starting with the Thirtieth Dynasty, the fifth dynasty in the Late Period, and extending into the Ptolemaic era. These temples ranged from the Delta to the island of Philae. While Egypt underwent outside influences through trade and conquest by foreign states, these temples remained in the traditional Egyptian style with very little Hellenistic influence.

Another relief originating from the Thirtieth Dynasty was the rounded modeling of the body and limbs, which gave the subjects a more fleshy or heavy effect. For example, for female figures, their breasts would swell and overlap the upper arm in painting. In more realistic portrayals, men would be fat or wrinkled.

Another type of art that became increasingly common during this period was the Horus stelae. These originate from the late New Kingdom and intermediate period but were increasingly common during the fourth century to the Ptolemaic era. These statues would often depict a young Horus holding snakes and standing on some kind of dangerous beast. The depiction of Horus comes from the Egyptian myth where a young Horus is saved from a scorpion bite, resulting in his gaining power over all dangerous animals. These statues were used "to ward off attacks from harmful creatures, and to cure snake bites and scorpion stings".

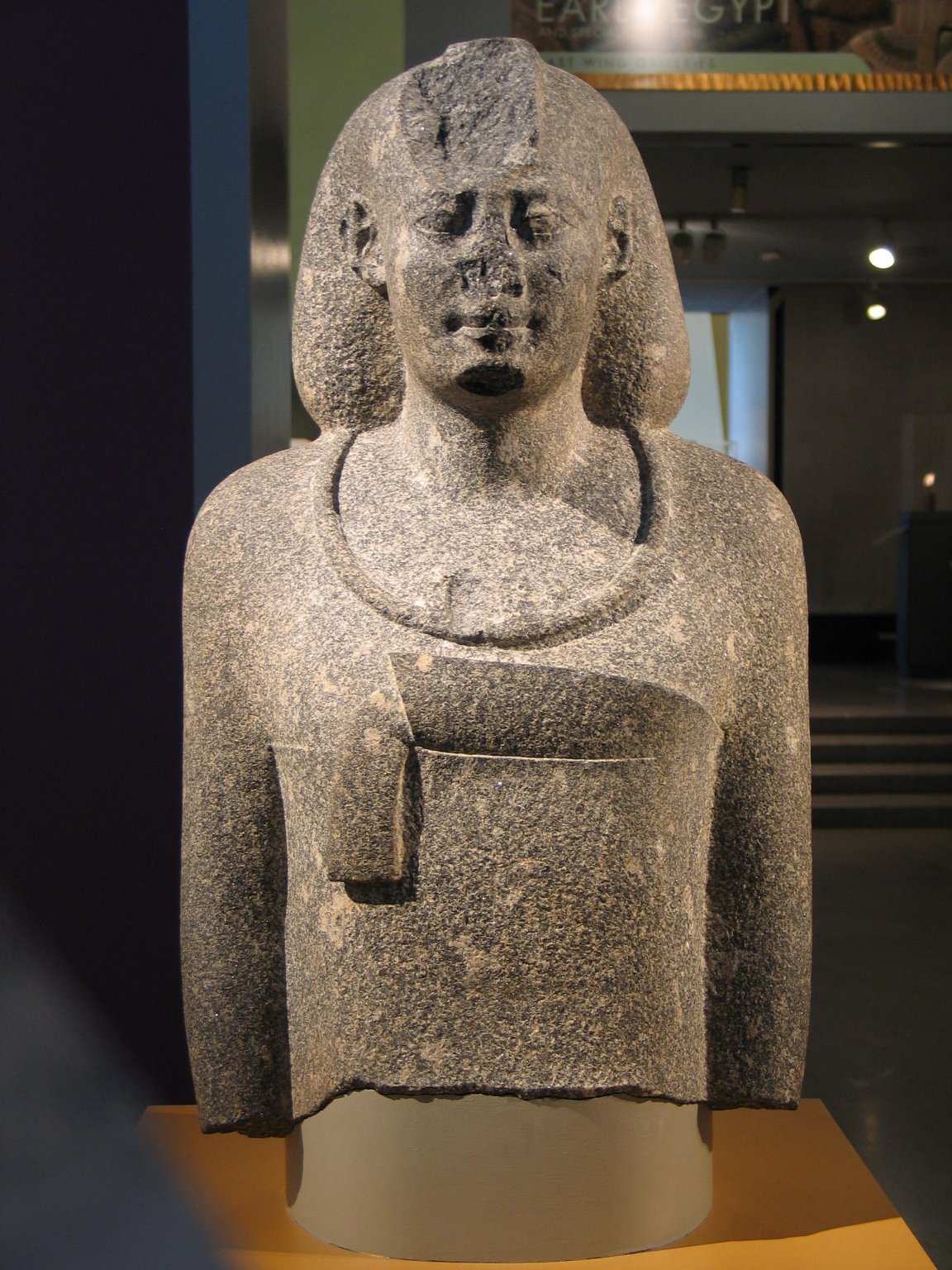
Egyptian man in a Persian costume, c. 343–332 BC, accession number 71.139, Brooklyn Museum.

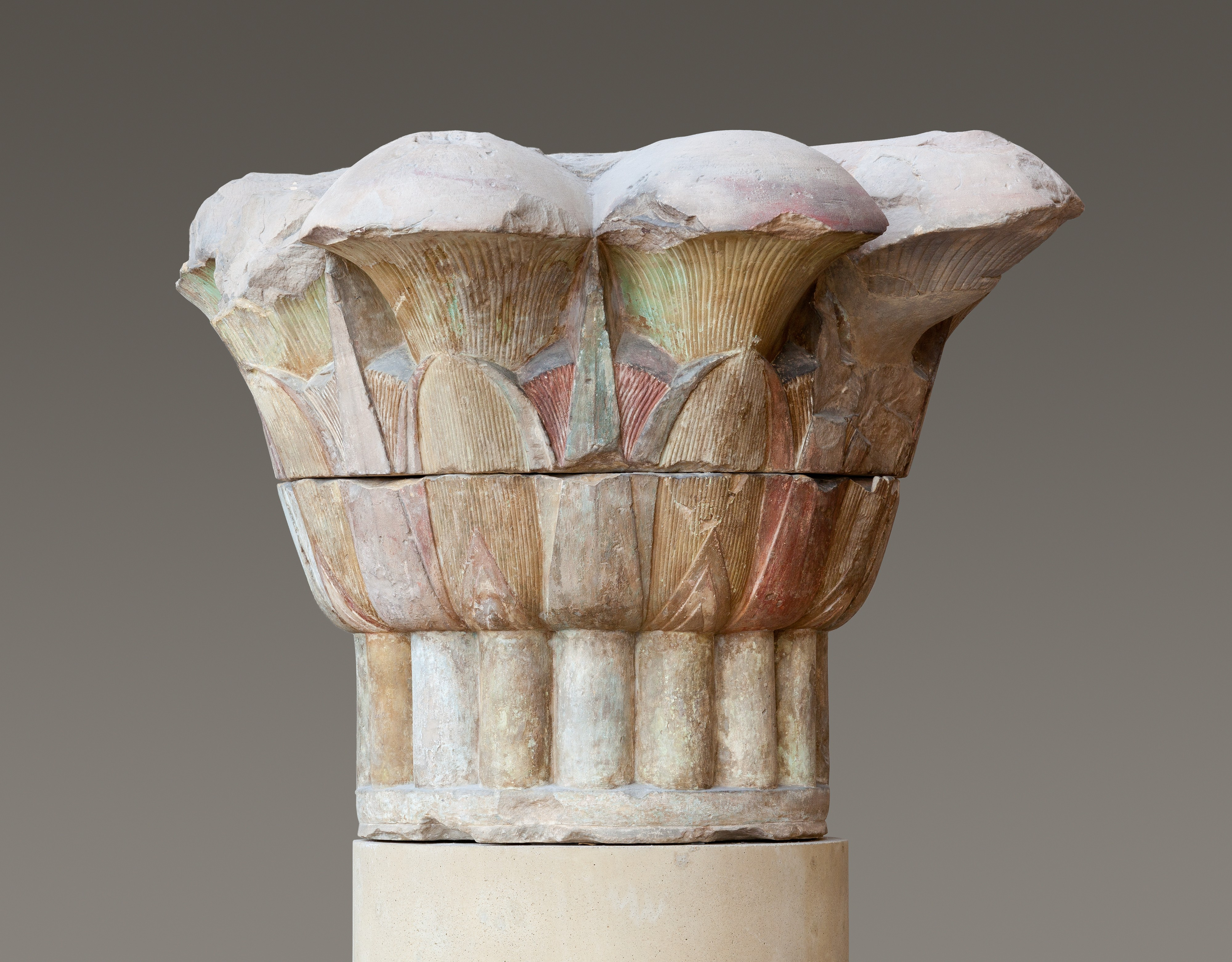
Composite papyrus capital; 380–343 BC; painted sandstone; height: 126 cm; Metropolitan Museum of Art (New York City)

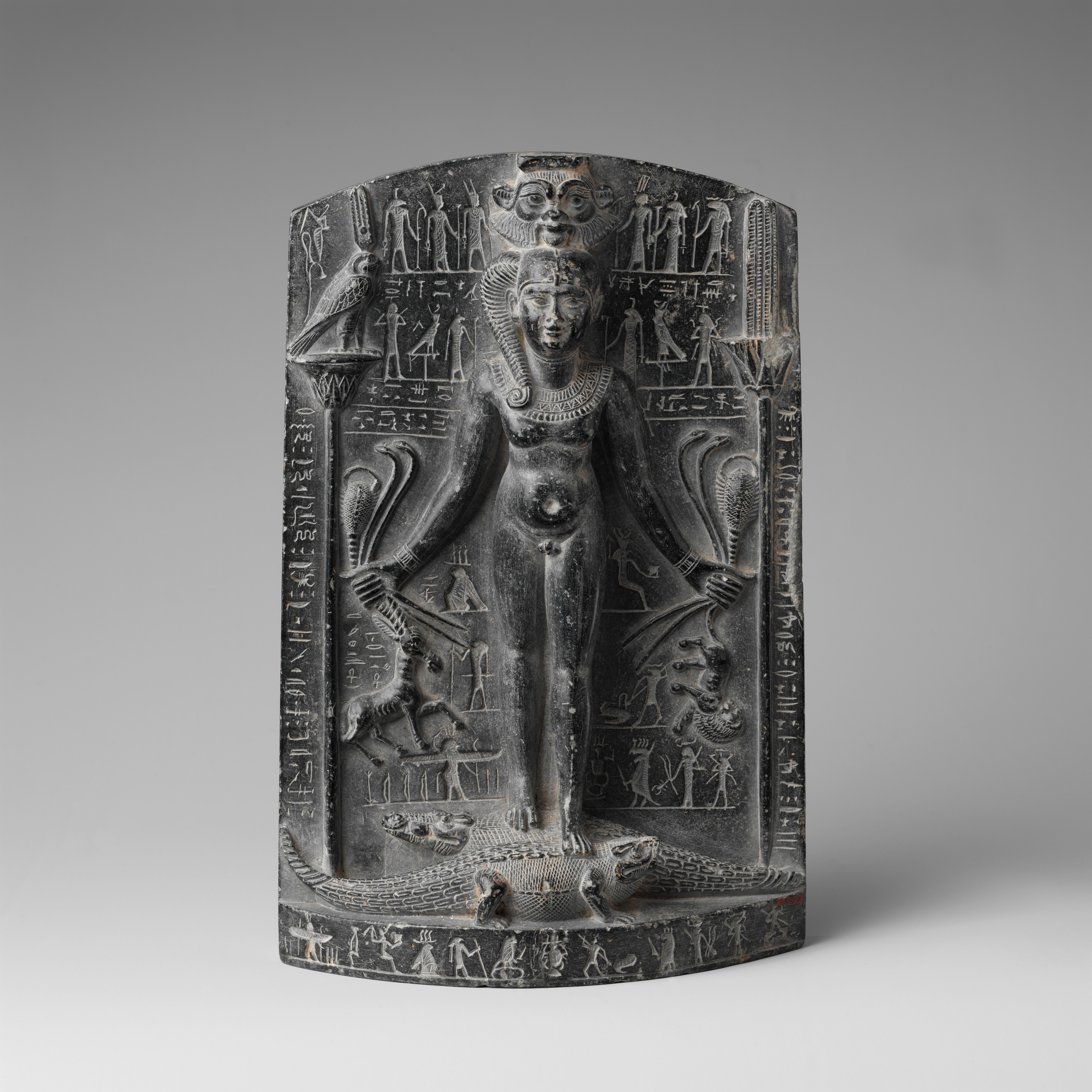
Magical stela or cippus of Horus; 332–280 BC; chlorite schist; height: 20.5 cm; Metropolitan Museum of Art

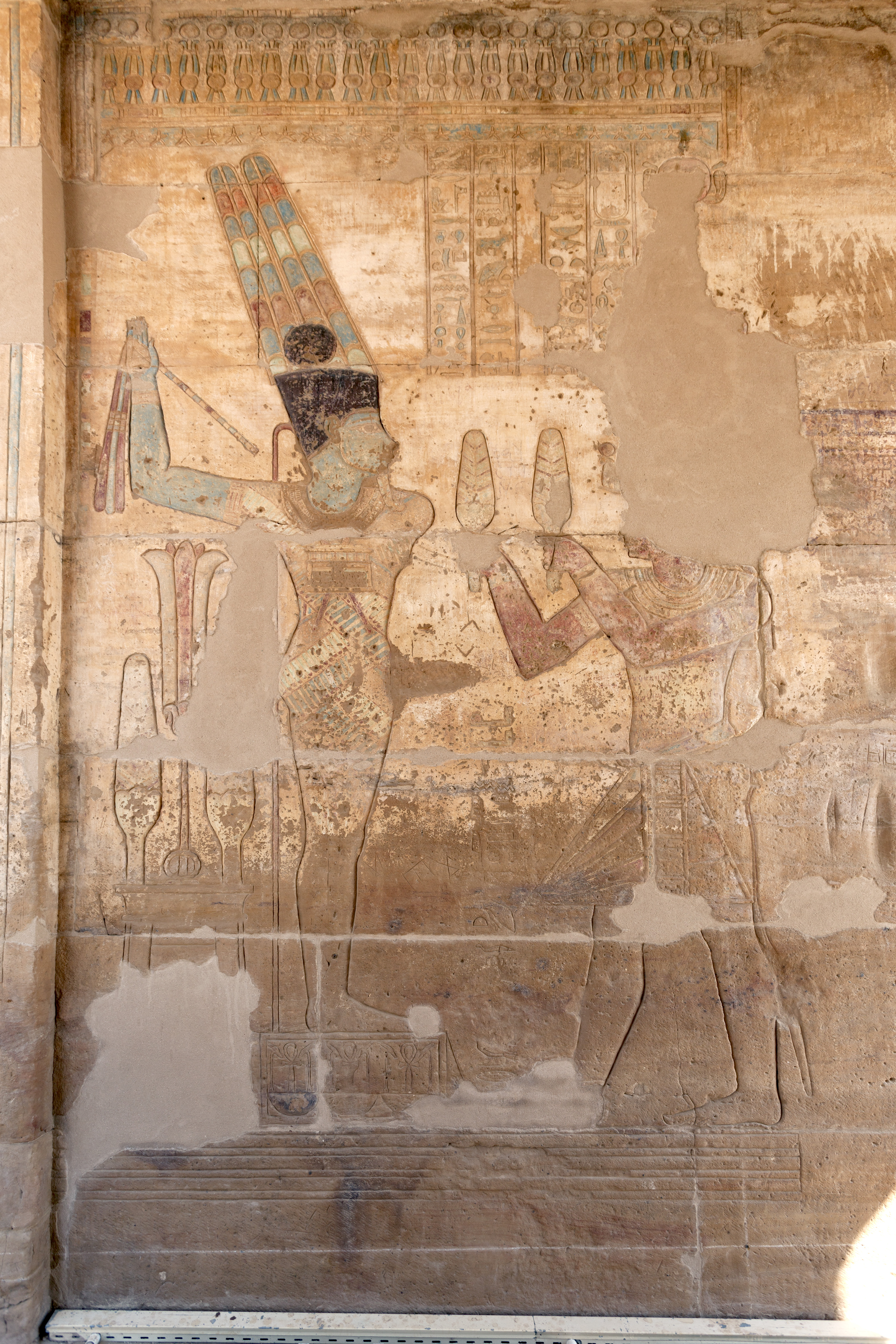
Relief showing Darius I offering lettuces to Amun, in the Temple of Hibis (Kharga Oasis, Egypt)

=== Ptolemaic Period (305–30 BC) ===
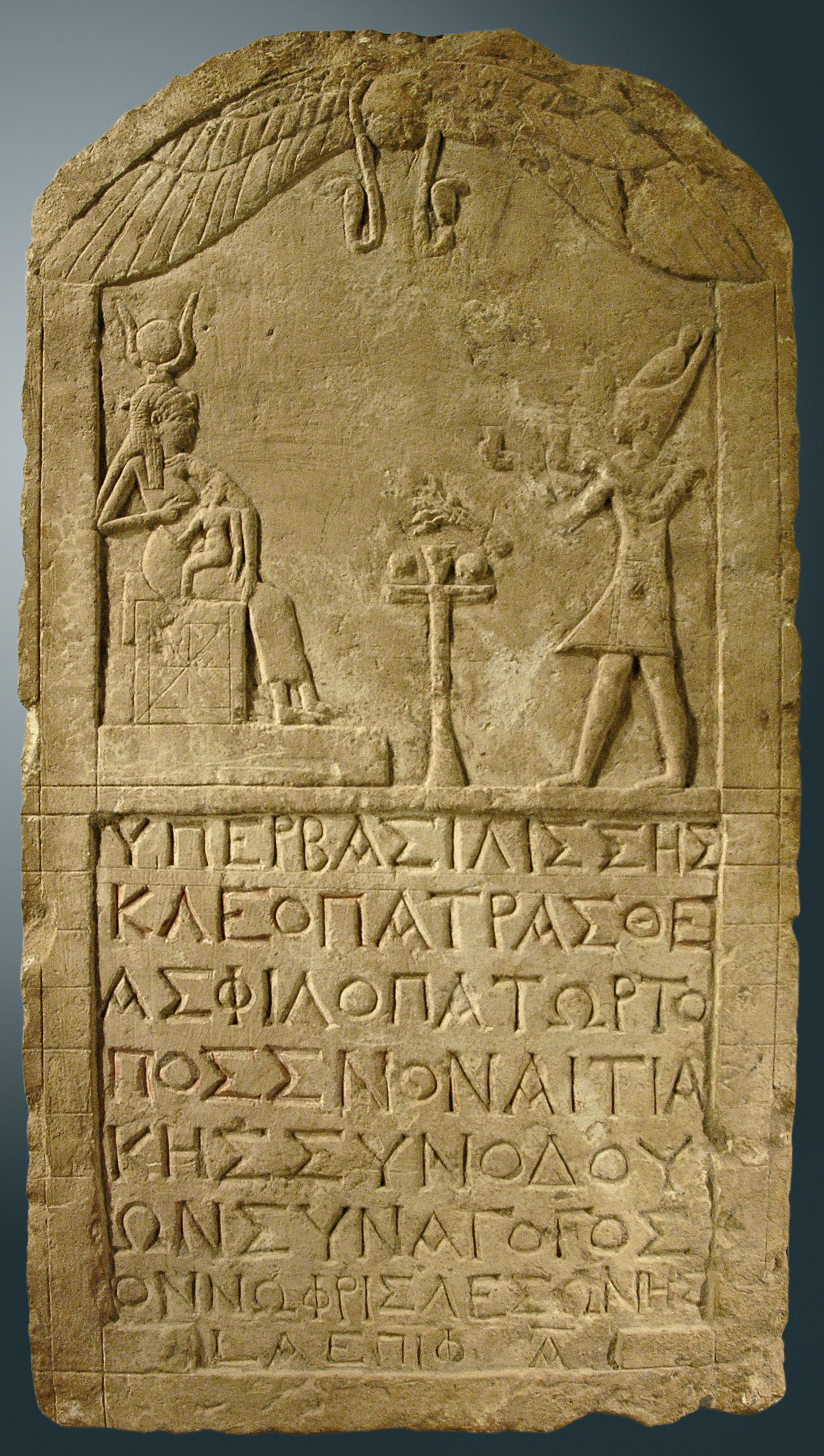
Stele; limestone; 52.4 × 28 × 4 cm; Louvre. A votive inscription dedicated by a Greek called Onnophris that depicts a male pharaoh presenting offerings to the goddess Isis, but honours in its text a queen Cleopatra (probably Cleopatra VII). (Note: It is disputed whether Cleopatra was deliberately depicted as a male or whether a stele made under her father with his portrait was later inscribed with an inscription for Cleopatra. On this and other uncertainties regarding this stele, see Pfeiffer (2015, pp. 177–181).)

Discoveries made since the end of the 19th century surrounding the (now submerged) ancient Egyptian city of Heracleion at Alexandria include a 4th century BC, unusually sensual, detailed and feministic (as opposed to deified) depiction of Isis, marking a combination of Egyptian and Hellenistic forms beginning around the time of Egypt's conquest by Alexander the Great in 332–331 BC. However, this was atypical of Ptolemaic sculpture, which generally avoided mixing Egyptian styles with the Hellenistic style used in the court art of the Ptolemaic dynasty, while temples in the rest of the country continued using late versions of traditional Egyptian formulae. Scholars have proposed an "Alexandrian style" in Hellenistic sculpture, but there is in fact little to connect it with Alexandria.

Marble was extensively used in court art, although it all had to be imported and use was made of various marble-saving techniques, such as using a number of pieces attached with stucco; a head might have the beard, the back of the head and hair in separate pieces. In contrast to the art of other Hellenistic kingdoms, Ptolemaic royal portraits are generalized and idealized, with little concern for achieving an individual portrait, though coins allow some portrait sculpture to be identified as one of the fifteen King Ptolemys. Many later portraits have clearly had the face reworked to show a later king. One Egyptian trait was to give much greater prominence to the queens than other successor dynasties to Alexander, with the royal couple often shown as a pair. This predated the 2nd century, when a series of queens exercised real power.

In the 2nd century, Egyptian temple sculptures began to reuse court models in their faces, and sculptures of a priest often used a Hellenistic style to achieve individually distinctive portrait heads. Many small statuettes were produced, with the most common types being Alexander, a generalized "King Ptolemy", and a naked Aphrodite. Pottery figurines included grotesques and fashionable ladies of the Tanagra figurine style. Erotic groups featured absurdly large phalli. Some fittings for wooden interiors include very delicately patterned polychrome falcons in faience.

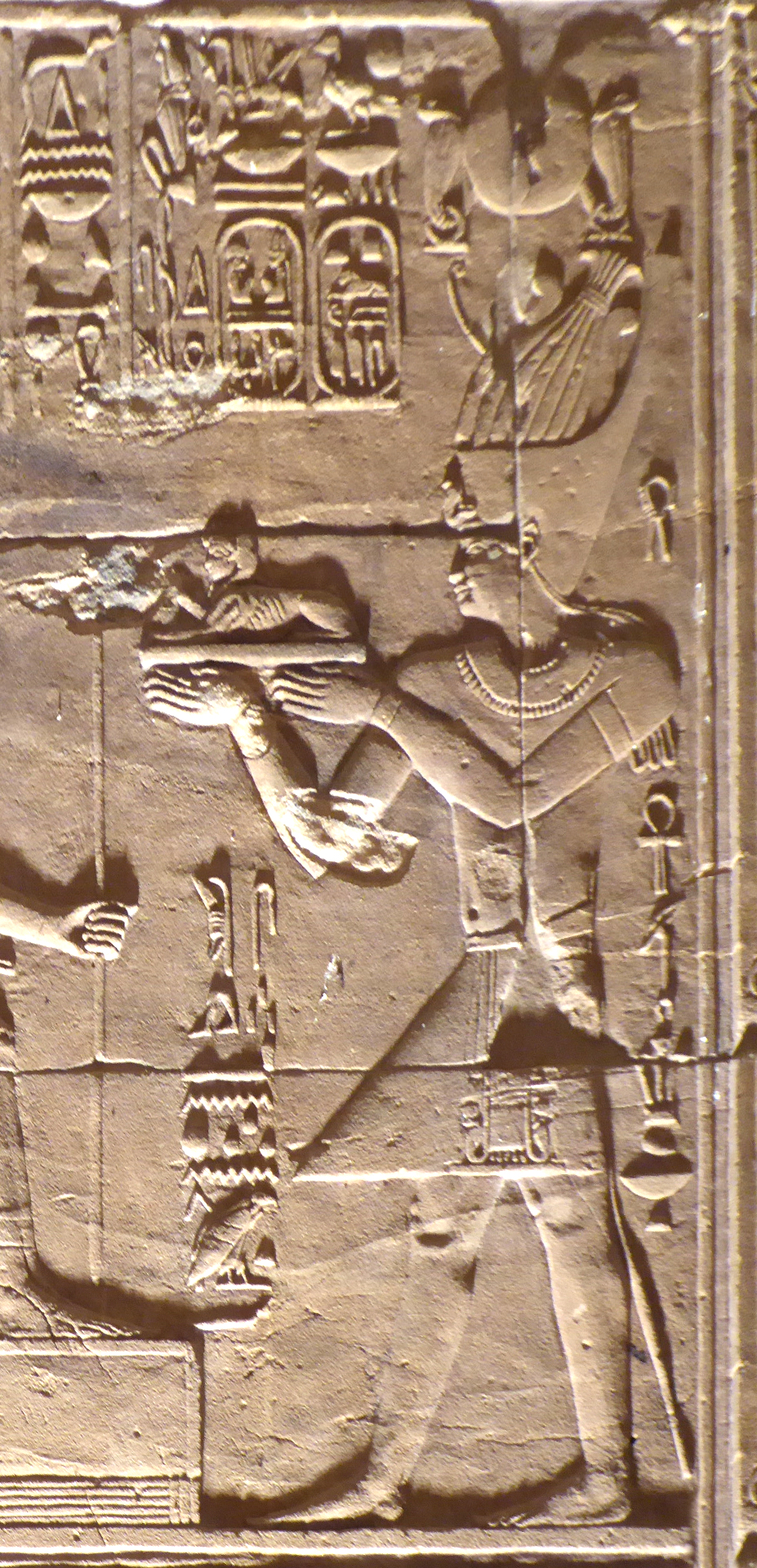
Ptolemy XII making offerings to Egyptian gods, in the Temple of Hathor, 54 BC, Dendera, Egypt

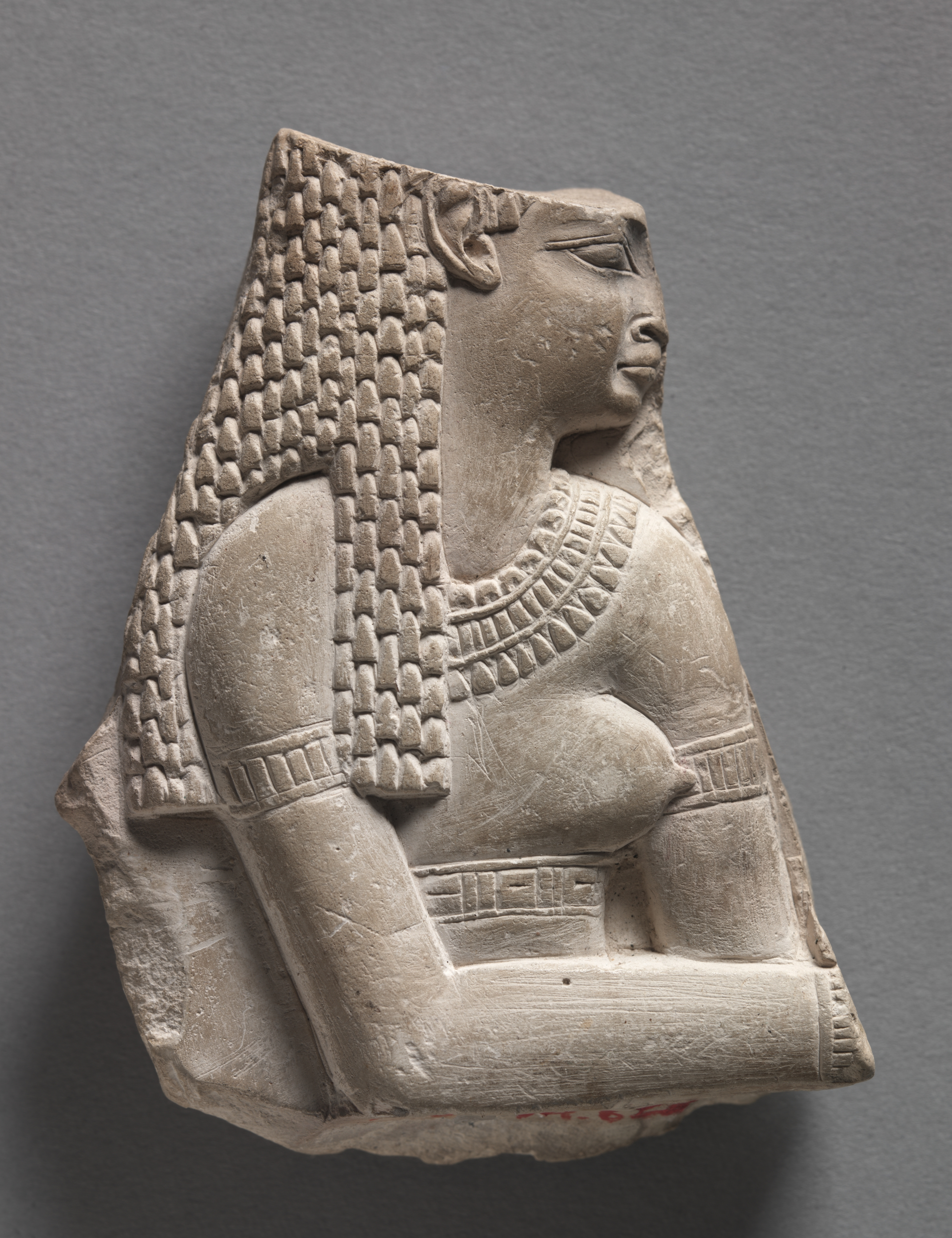
Double-sided votive relief; c. 305 BC; limestone; 8.3 × 6.5 × 1.4 cm; Cleveland Museum of Art (Cleveland, Ohio, US)

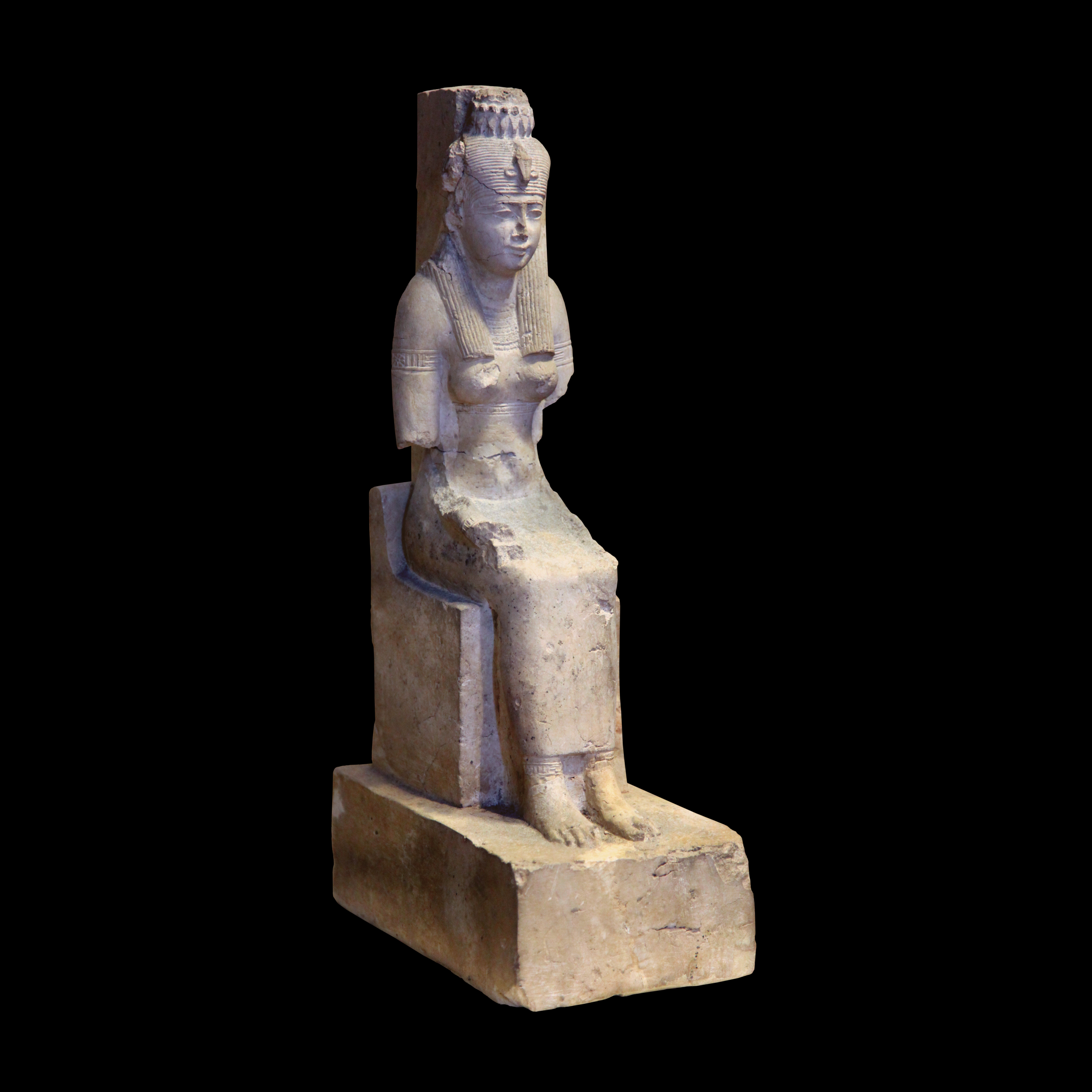
Statue of the goddess Raet-Tawy; 332–30 BC; limestone; 46 × 13.7 × 23.7 cm; Louvre

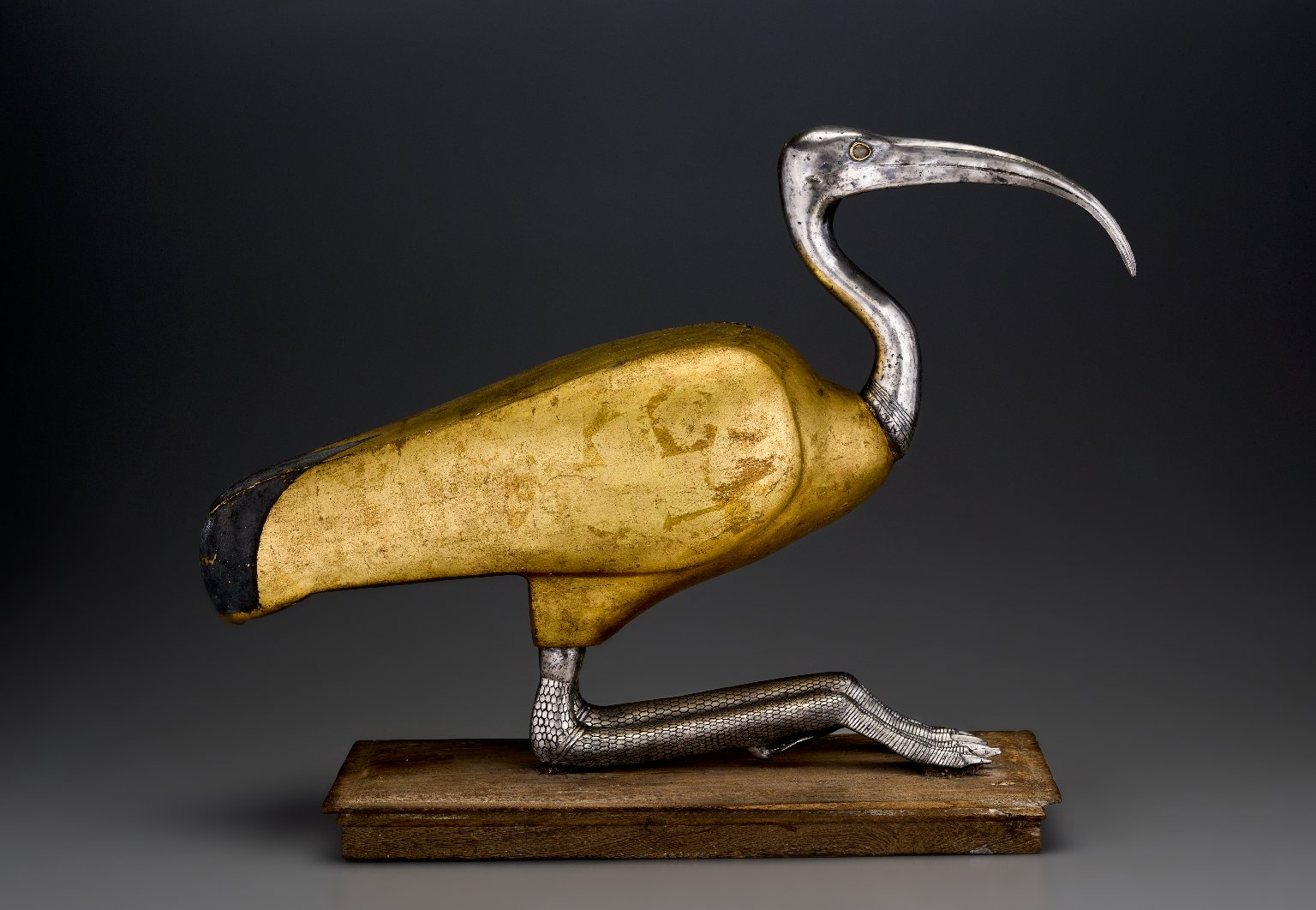
Ibis coffin; 305–30 BC; wood, silver, gold, and rock crystal; 38.2 × 20.2 × 55.8 cm; Brooklyn Museum (New York City)

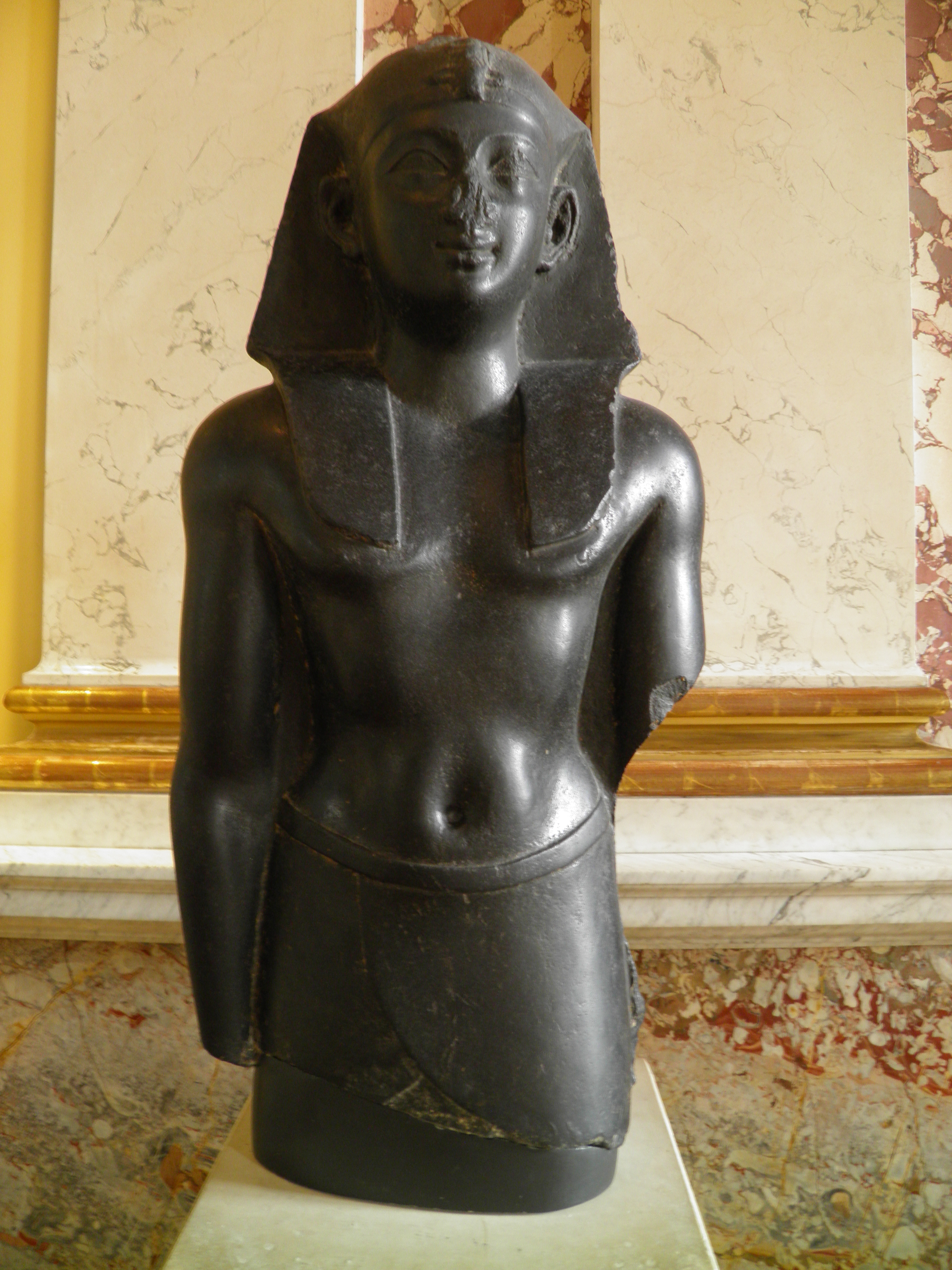
Statue of a Ptolemaic king; 1st century BC; basalt; height: 82 cm, width: 39.5 cm; Louvre

=== Roman Period (30 BC–619 AD) ===
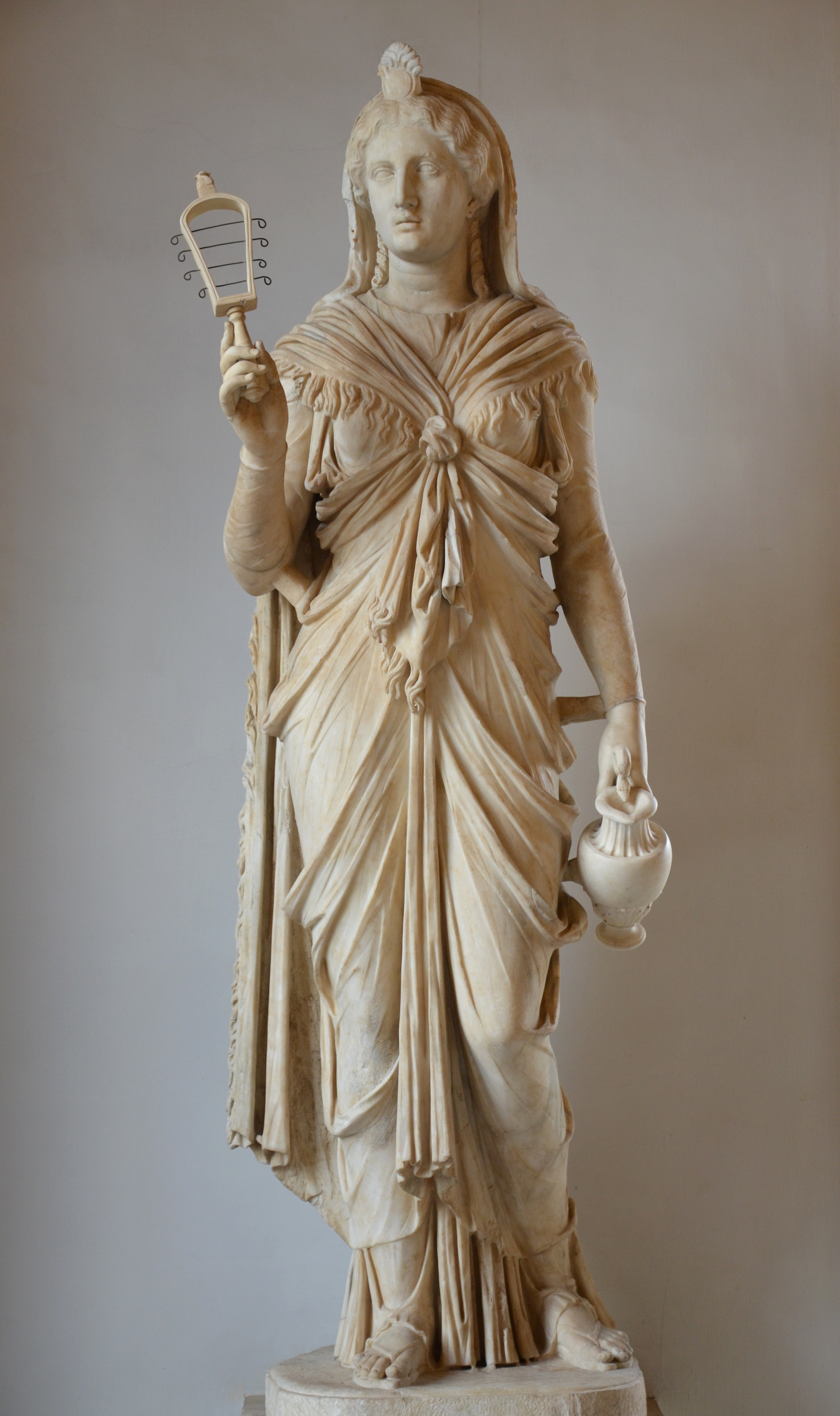
Roman statue of Isis, first or second century CE. She holds a sistrum and a pitcher of water, although these attributes were added in a seventeenth century renovation.

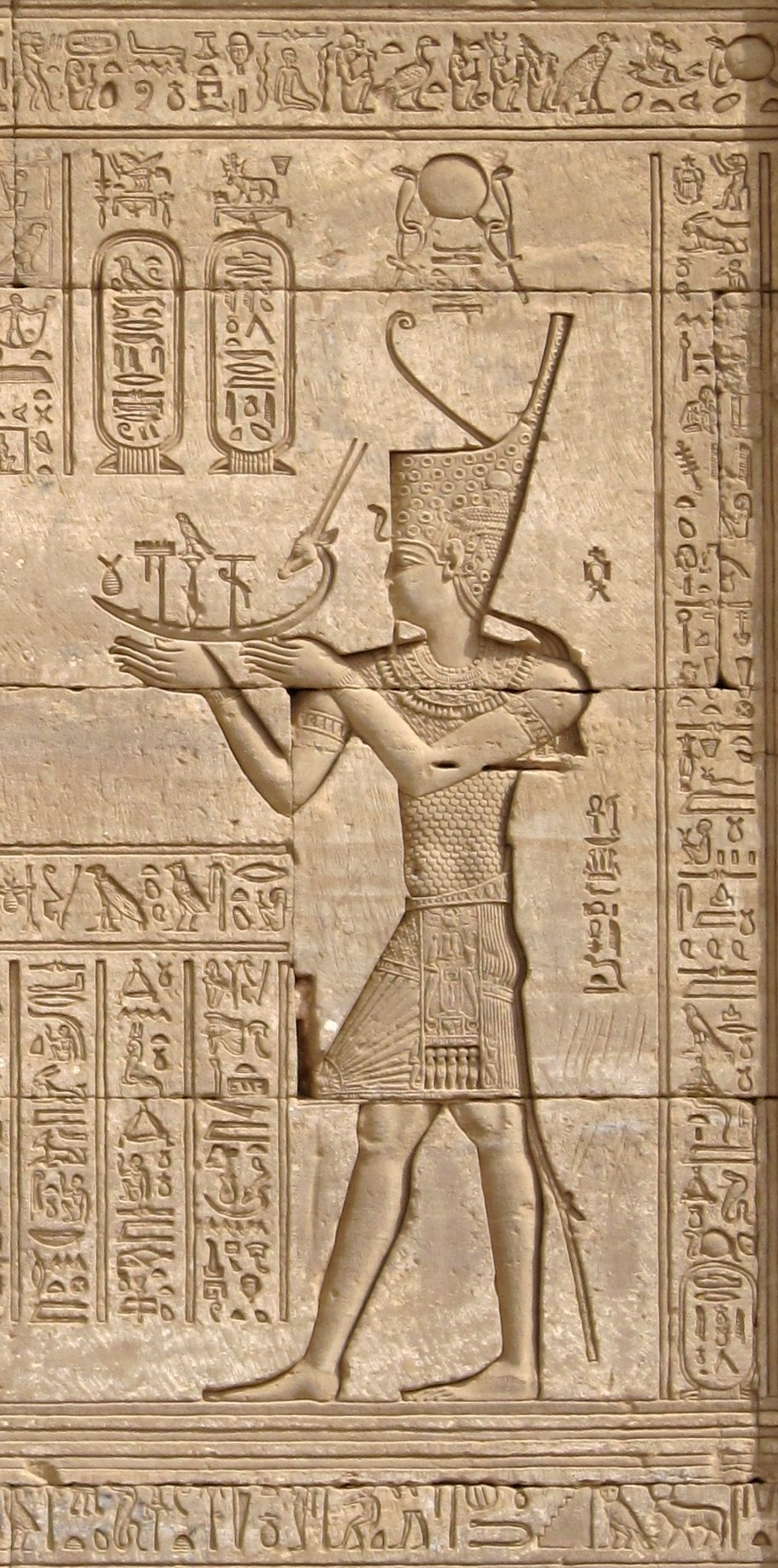
Roman Emperor Trajan (ruled 98–117 AD) making offerings to Egyptian gods, on the Roman Mammisi at the Dendera Temple complex, Egypt.

The Fayum mummy portraits are probably the most famous example of Egyptian art during the Roman period of Egypt. They were a type of naturalistic painted portrait on wooden boards attached to upper class mummies from Roman Egypt. They belong to the tradition of panel painting, one of the most highly regarded forms of art in the Classical world. The Fayum portraits are the only large body of art from that tradition to have survived.

Mummy portraits have been found across Egypt, but are most common in the Faiyum Basin, particularly from Hawara (hence the common name) and the Hadrianic Roman city Antinoopolis. "Faiyum portraits" is generally used as a stylistic, rather than a geographic, description. While painted cartonnage mummy cases date back to pharaonic times, the Faiyum mummy portraits were an innovation dating to the time of the Roman occupation of Egypt.

The portraits date to the Imperial Roman era, from the late 1st century BC or the early 1st century AD onwards. It is not clear when their production ended, but recent research suggests the middle of the 3rd century. They are among the largest groups among the very few survivors of the panel painting tradition of the classical world, which was continued into Byzantine and Western traditions in the post-classical world, including the local tradition of Coptic iconography in Egypt.

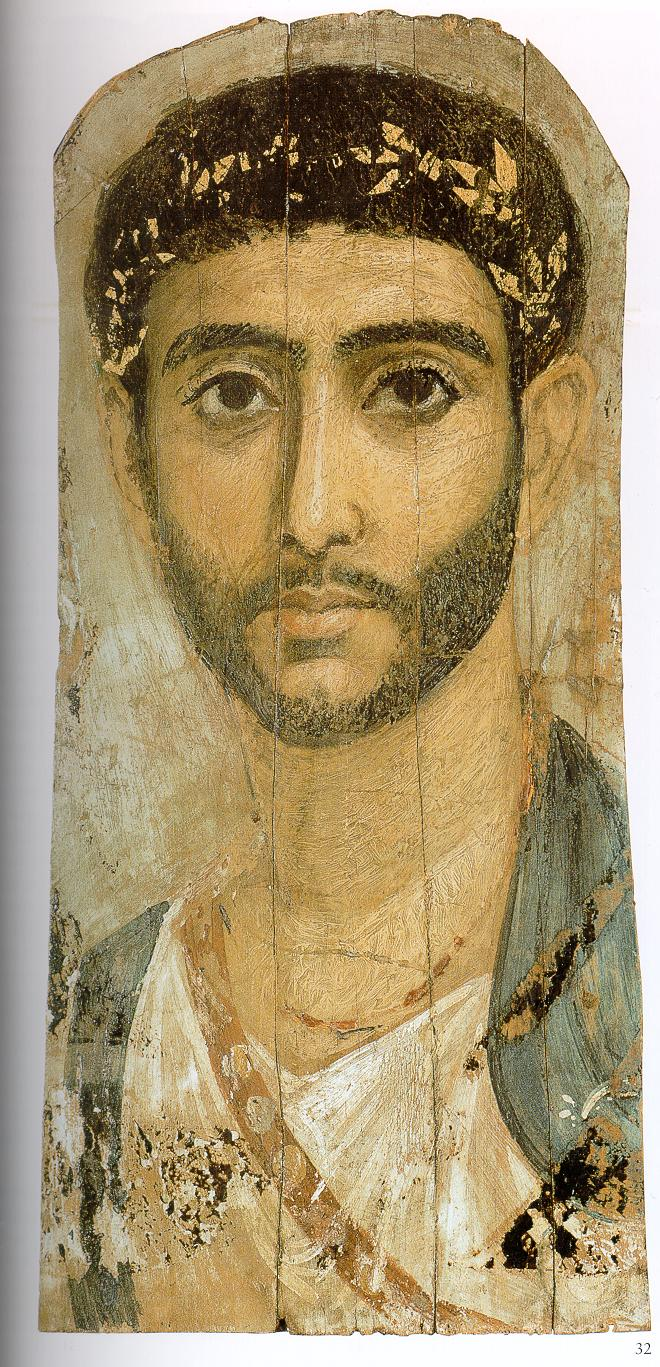
The Fayum mummy portraits epitomize the meeting of Egyptian and Roman cultures.

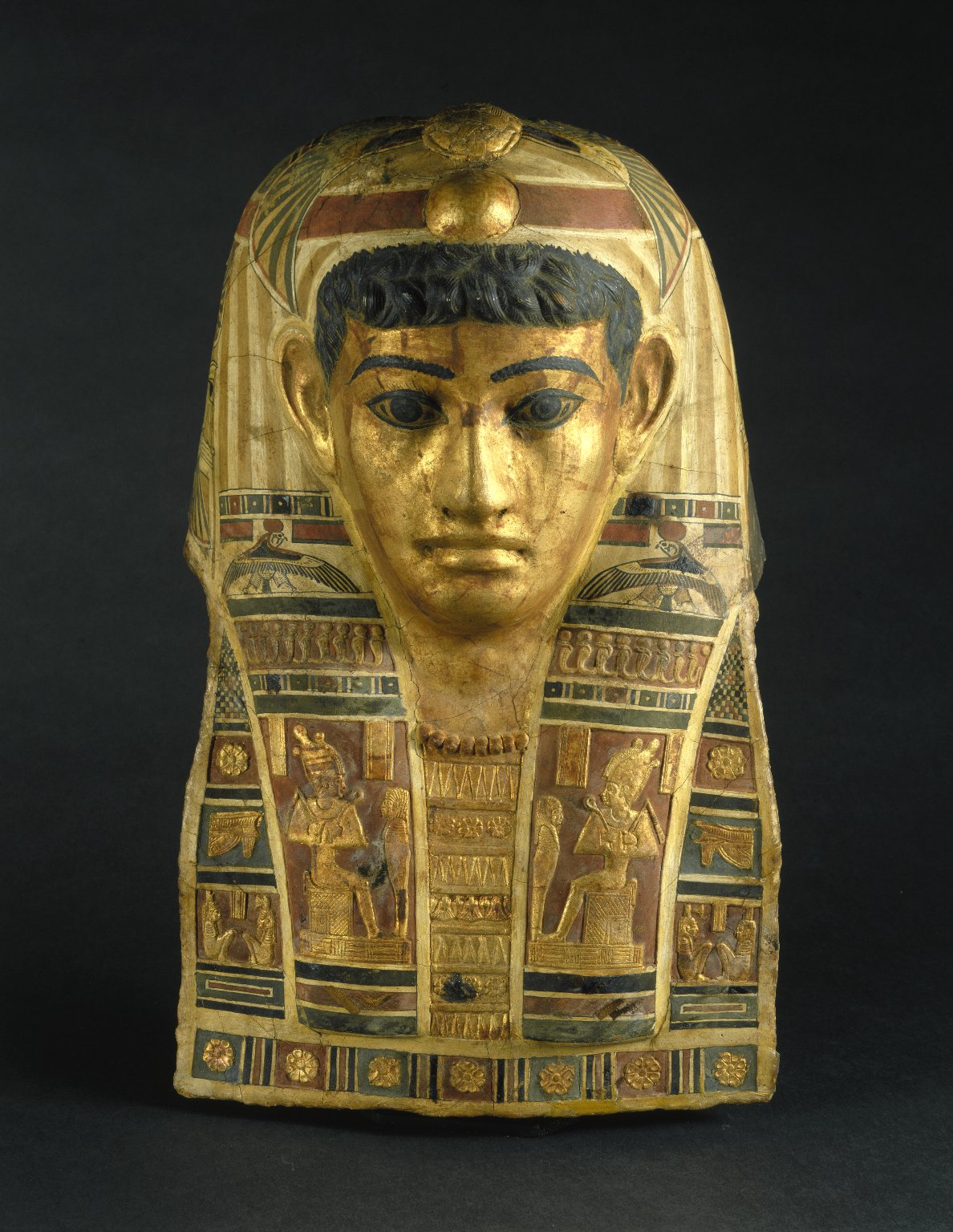
Mummy mask of a man; early 1st century AD; stucco, gilded and painted; 51.5 x 33 x 20 cm; Brooklyn Museum (New York City)

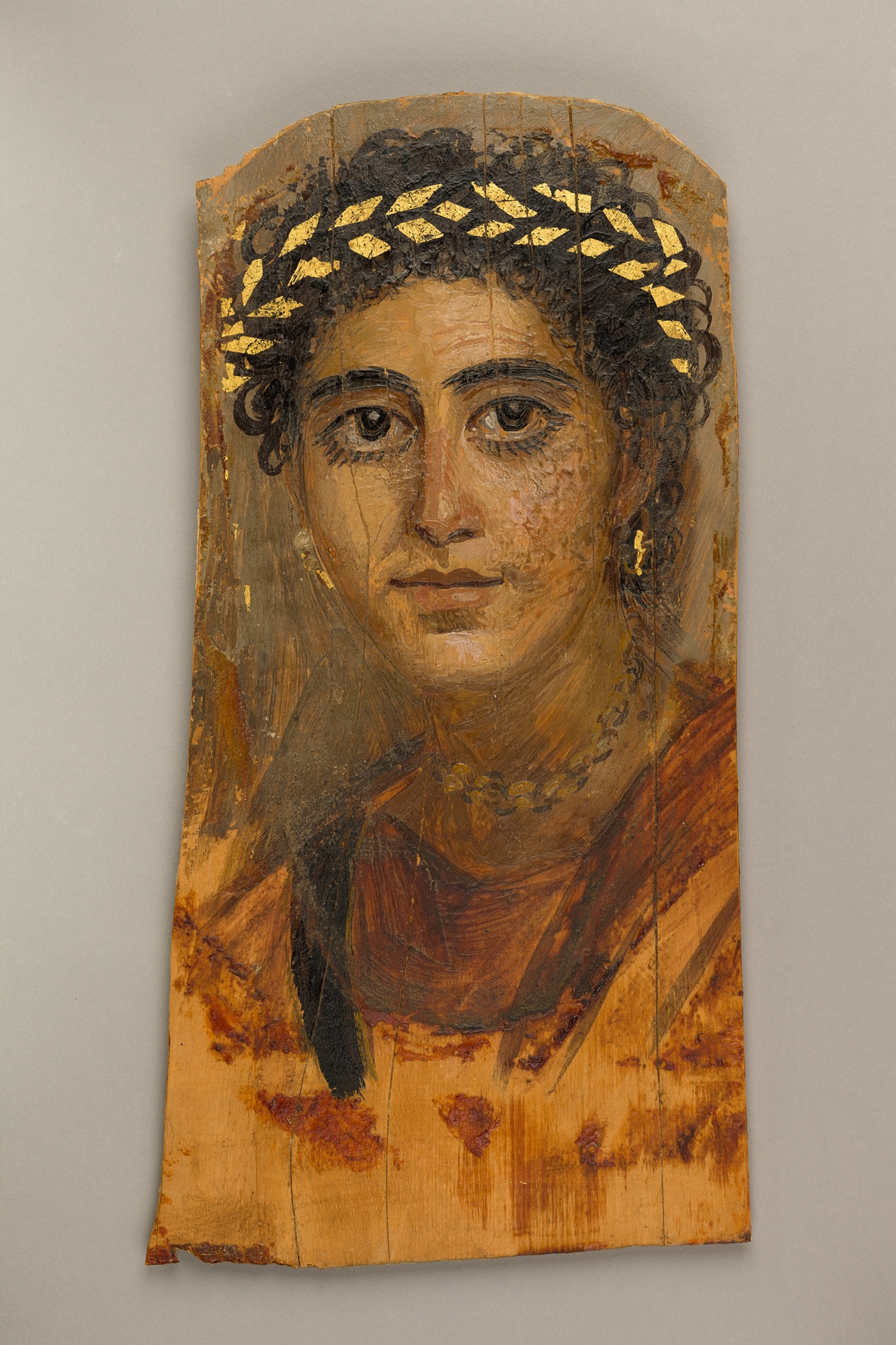
Portrait of a young woman in red; c. 90–120 ; encaustic painting on limewood with gold leaf; height: 38 cm (15 in); Metropolitan Museum of Art (New York City)

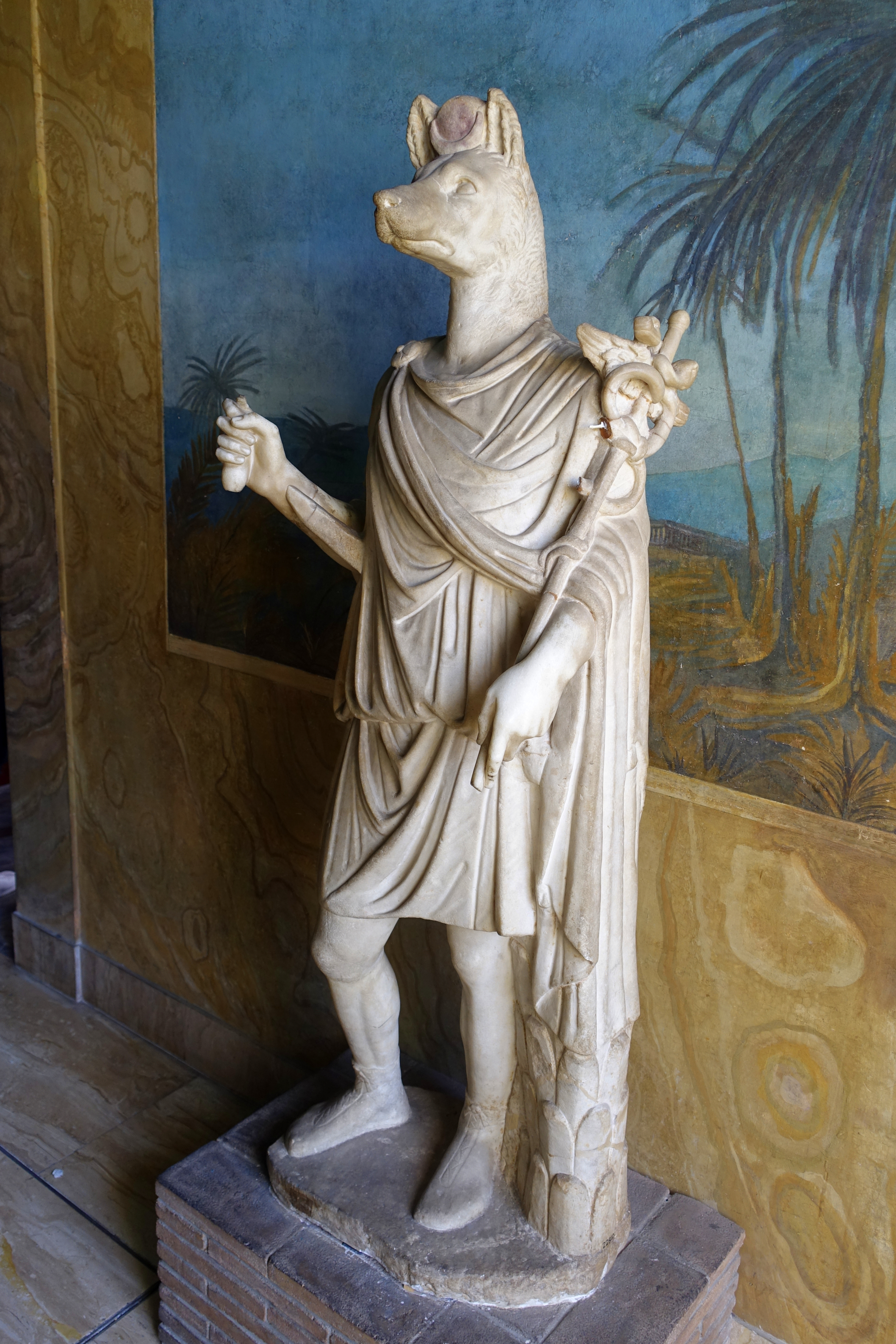
Statue of Hermanubis; 100–138; marble; height: 1.5 m, width: 50 cm; from Tivoli (Rome); Vatican Museums (Vatican City)

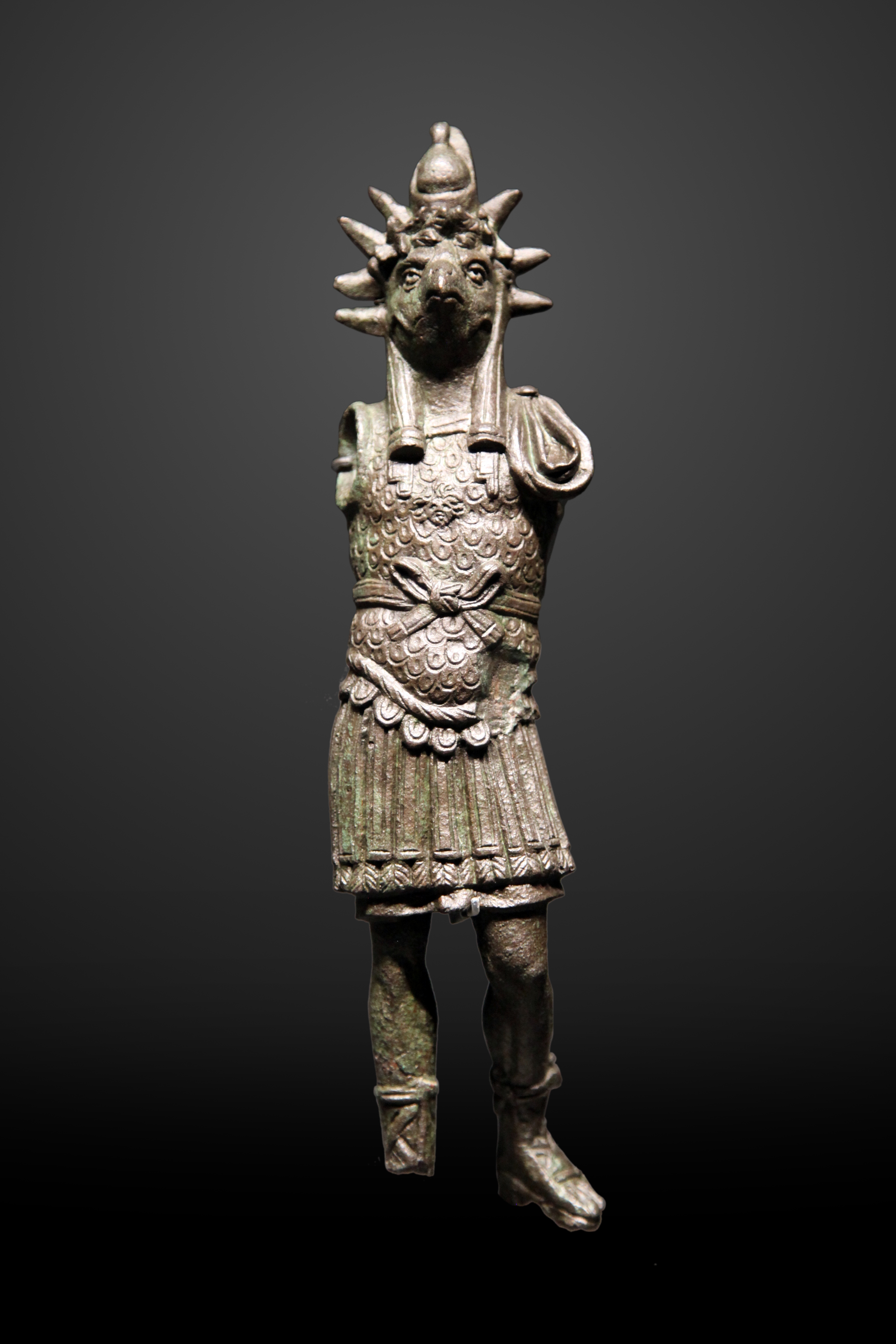
Horus as emperor; 2nd century; bronze; height: 26.5 cm; Louvre

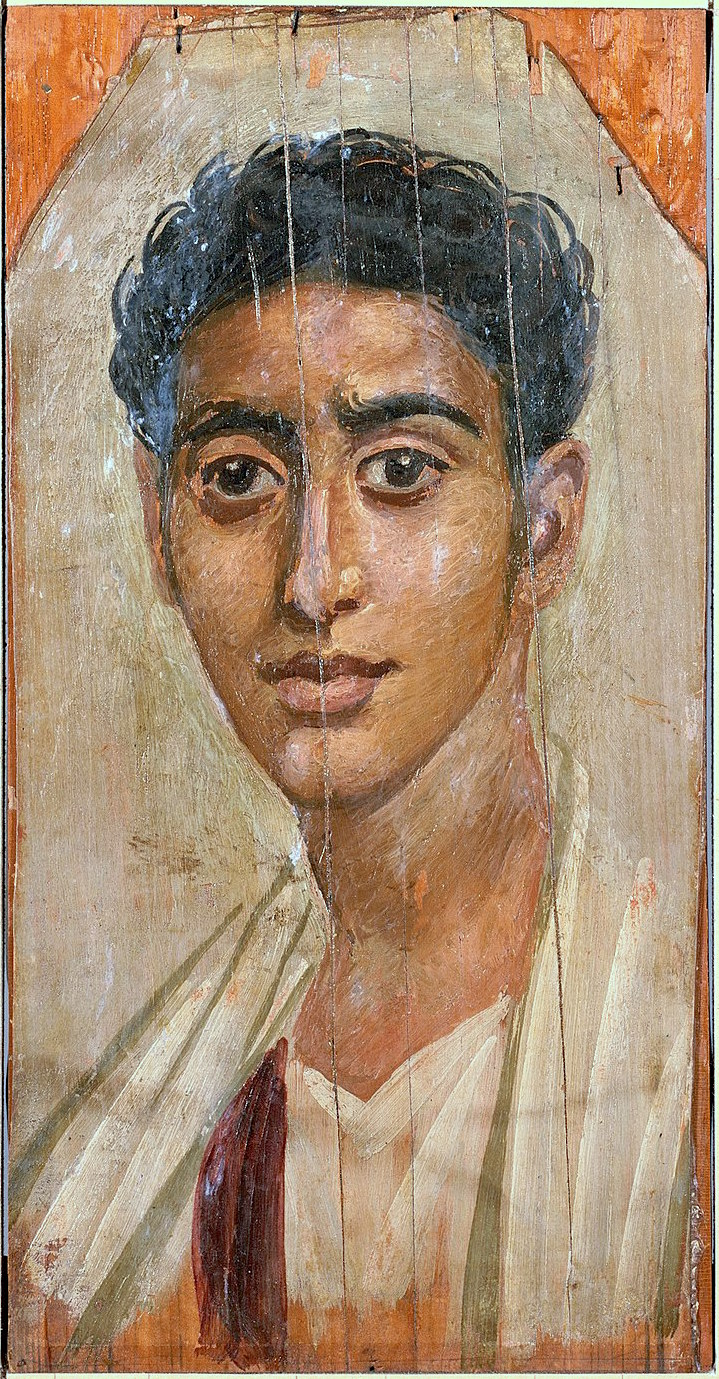
Mummy portrait of a man; late 1st century; encaustic painting on wood; Walters Art Museum (Baltimore, Maryland, US)

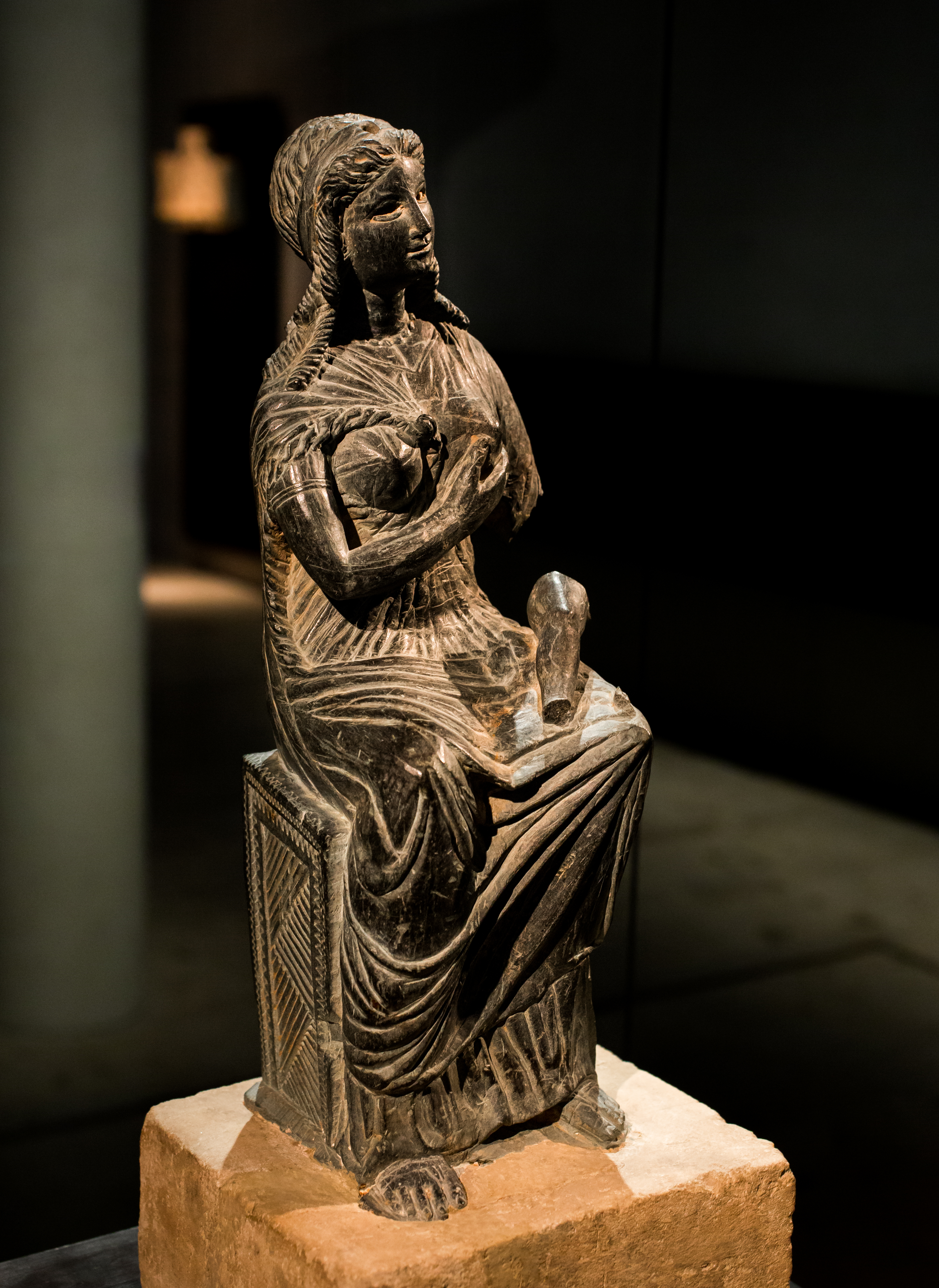
Isis suckling her baby Horus (of whom only the left leg is preserved); 1st century AD; siltstone (basis: limestone); height: 33.9 cm; from Mata´na el-Asfu; Staatliche Sammlung für Ägyptische Kunst (Munich, Germany)

== Characteristics ==
Egyptian art is known for its distinctive figure convention used for the main figures in both relief and painting, with parted legs (where not seated) and head shown as seen from the side, but the torso seen as from the front. The figures also have a standard set of proportions, measuring 18 "fists" from the ground to the hair-line on the forehead. This appears as early as the Narmer Palette from Dynasty I, but this idealized figure convention is not employed in the use of displaying minor figures shown engaged in some activity, such as captives and corpses. Other conventions make statues of males darker than those of females. Very conventionalized portrait statues appear from as early as the Second Dynasty (before 2,780 BC), and with the exception of the art of the Amarna period of Ahkenaten and some other periods such as the Twelfth Dynasty, the idealized features of rulers, like other Egyptian artistic conventions, changed little until the Greek conquest. Egyptian art uses hierarchical proportions, where the size of figures indicates their relative importance. The gods or the divine pharaoh are usually larger than other figures while the figures of high officials or the tomb owner are usually smaller, and at the smallest scale are any servants, entertainers, animals, trees, and architectural details.

=== Anonymity ===
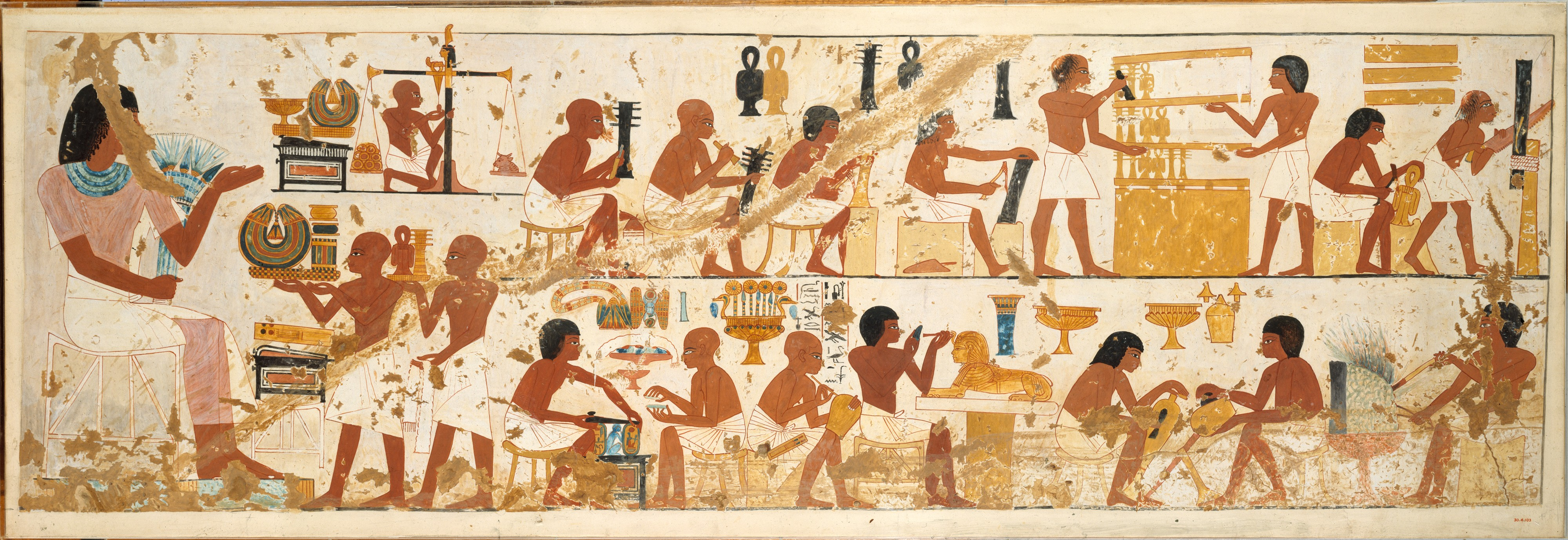
Depiction of craftworkers in ancient Egypt

Ancient Egyptian artists rarely left their names. The Egyptian artwork is anonymous also because most of the time it was collective. Diodorus of Sicily, who traveled and lived in Egypt, has written: "So, after the craftsmen have decided the height of the statue, they all go home to make the parts which they have chosen" (I, 98).

=== Symbolism ===
Symbolism pervaded Egyptian art and played an important role in establishing a sense of order. The pharaoh's regalia, for example, represented his power to maintain order. Animals were also highly symbolic figures in Egyptian art. Some colors were expressive.

The ancient Egyptian language had four basic color terms: kem (black), hedj (white/silver), wadj (green/blue) and desher (red/orange/yellow). Blue, for example, symbolized fertility, birth, and the life-giving waters of the Nile. Blue and green were the colors of vegetation, and hence of rejuvenation. Osiris could be shown with green skin; in the 26th Dynasty, the faces of coffins were often colored green to assist in rebirth.

This color symbolism explains the popularity of turquoise and faience in funerary equipment. The use of black for royal figures similarly expressed the fertile alluvial soil of the Nile from which Egypt was born, and carried connotations of fertility and regeneration. Hence statues of the king as Osiris often showed him with black skin. Black was also associated with the afterlife, and was the color of funerary deities such as Anubis.

Gold indicated divinity due to its unnatural appearance and association with precious materials. Furthermore, gold was regarded by the ancient Egyptians as "the flesh of the god". Silver, referred to as "white gold" by the Egyptians, was likewise called "the bones of the god".

Red, orange and yellow were ambivalent colors. They were, naturally, associated with the sun; red stones such as quartzite were favored for royal statues which stressed the solar aspects of kingship. Carnelian has similar symbolic associations in jewelry. Red ink was used to write important names on papyrus documents. Red was also the color of the deserts, and hence associated with Set.

== Materials ==
=== Faience ===
Egyptian faience is a ceramic material, made of quartz sand (or crushed quartz), small amounts of lime, and plant ash or natron. The ingredients were mixed together, glazed and fired to a hard shiny finish. Faience was widely used from the Predynastic Period until Islamic times for inlays and small objects, especially ushabtis. More accurately termed 'glazed composition', Egyptian faience was so named by early Egyptologists after its superficial resemblance to the tin-glazed earthenwares of medieval Italy (originally produced at Faenza). The Egyptian word for it was tjehenet, which means 'dazzling', and it was probably used, above all, as a cheap substitute for more precious materials like turquoise and lapis lazuli. Indeed, faience was most commonly produced in shades of blue-green, although a large range of colours was possible.

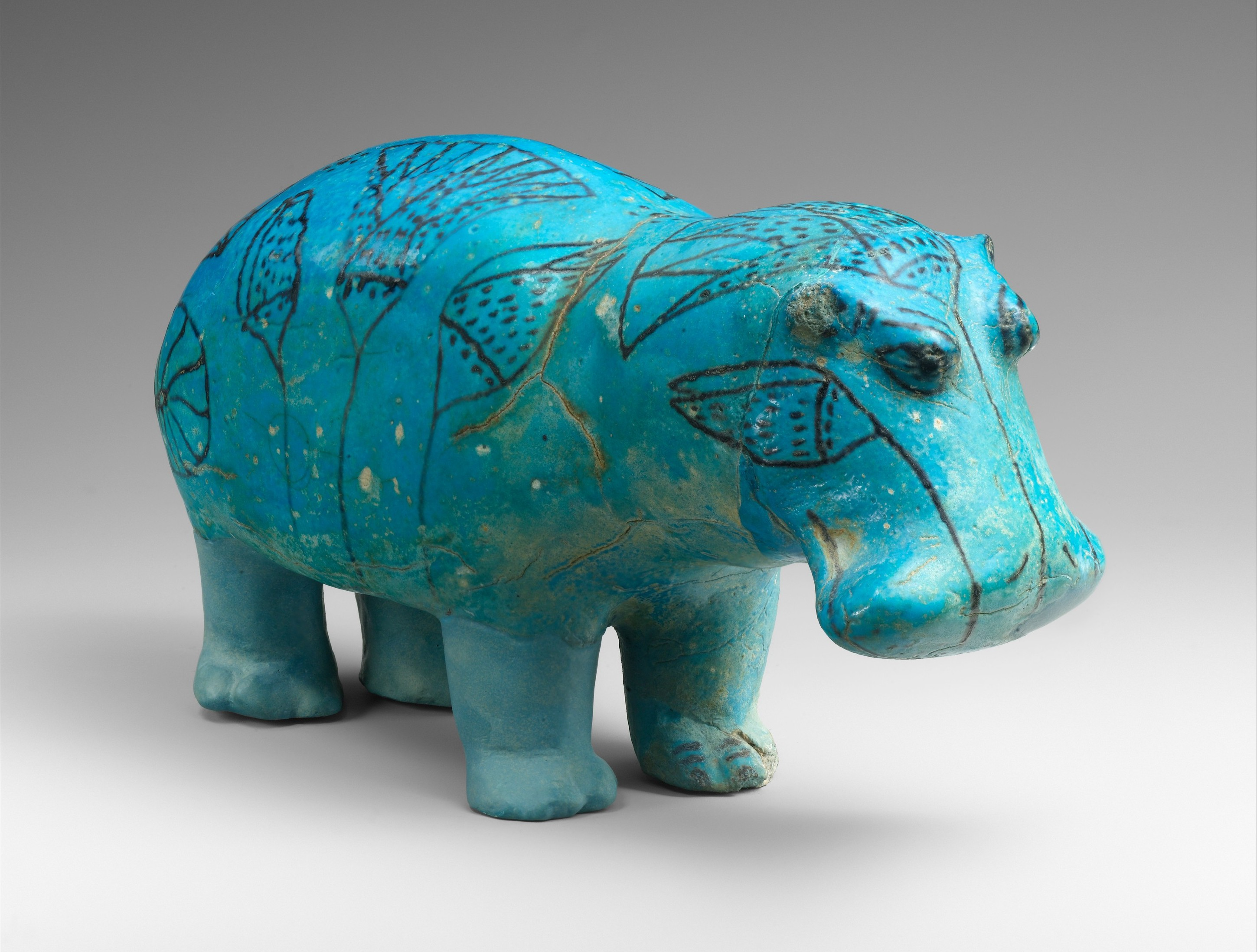
William the Faience Hippopotamus; 1961–1878 BC; faience; 11.2 × 7.5 cm; Metropolitan Museum of Art (New York City)

Ushabti; 1294–1279 BC; faience; height: 28.1 cm, width: 9.2 cm; Louvre

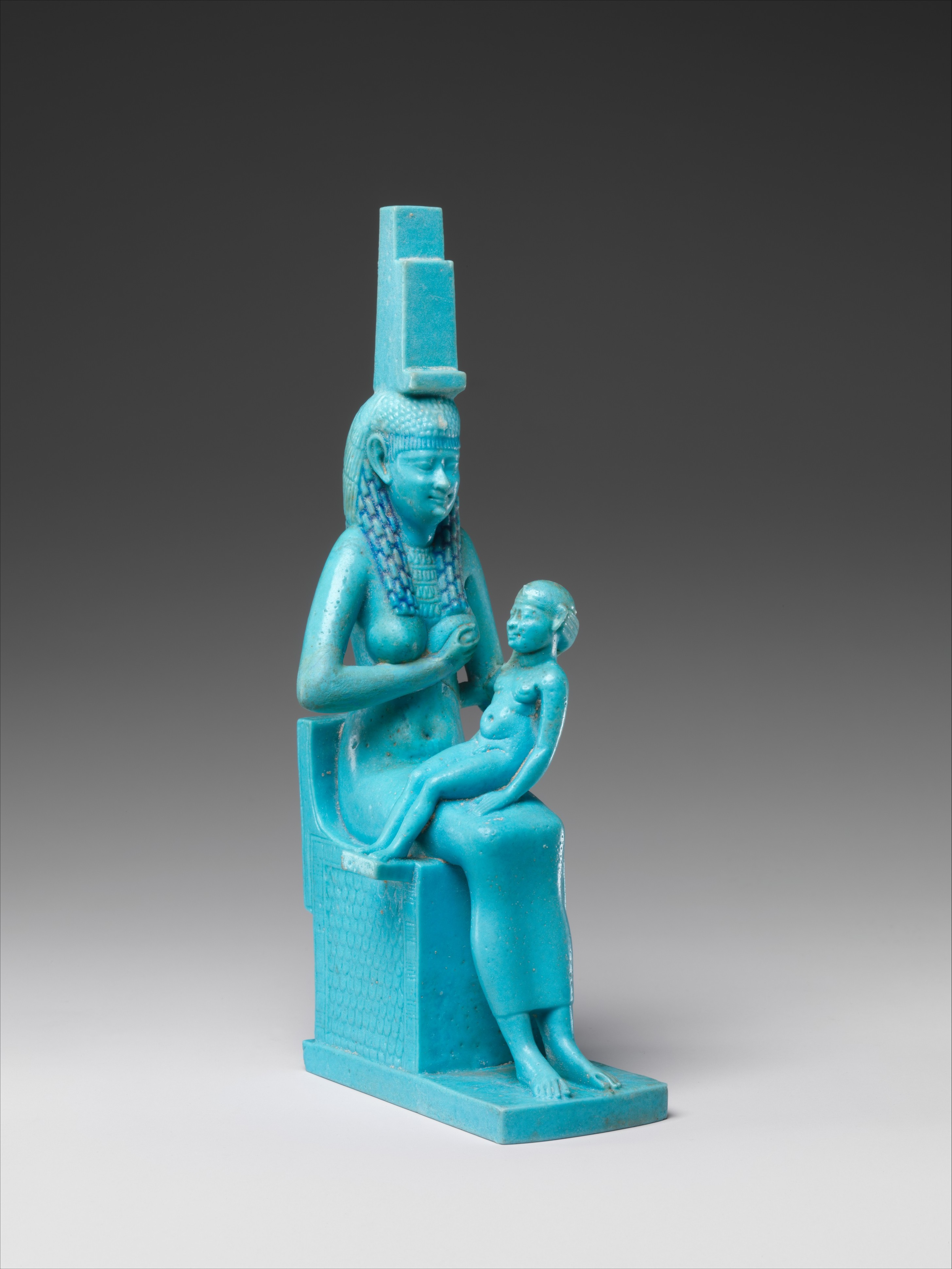
Statuette of Isis and Horus; 332–30 BC; faience; height: 17 cm, width: 5.1 cm, depth: 7.7 cm; Metropolitan Museum of Art

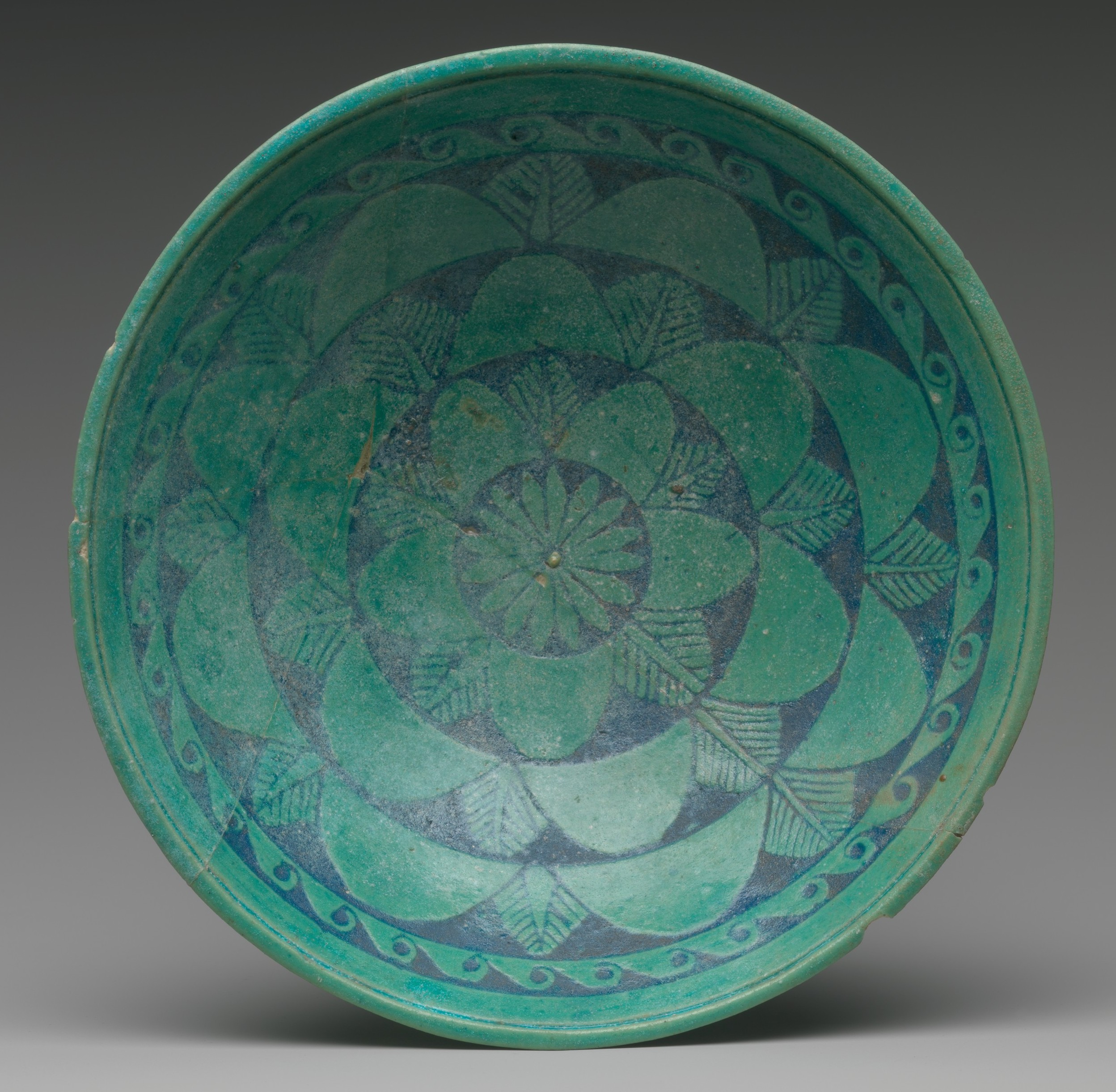
Bowl; 200–150 BC; faience; 4.8 × 16.9 cm; Metropolitan Museum of Art

=== Glass ===
Although the glassy materials faience and Egyptian blue were manufactured in Egypt from an early period, the technology for making glass itself was only perfected in the early 18th Dynasty. It was probably imported from Levant, since the Egyptian words for glass are of foreign origin. The funerary objects of Amenhotep II included many glass artefacts, demonstrating a range of different techniques. At this period, the material was costly and rare, and may have been a royal monopoly. However, by the end of the 18th Dynasty, Egypt probably made sufficient quantities to export glass to other parts of the Eastern Mediterranean. Glass workshops have been excavated at Amarna and Pi-Ramesses. The raw materials – silica, alkali and lime – were readily available in Egypt, although ready-made ingots of blue glass were also imported from the Levant and have been found in the cargo of the Uluburun shipwreck off the southern coast of Turkey.

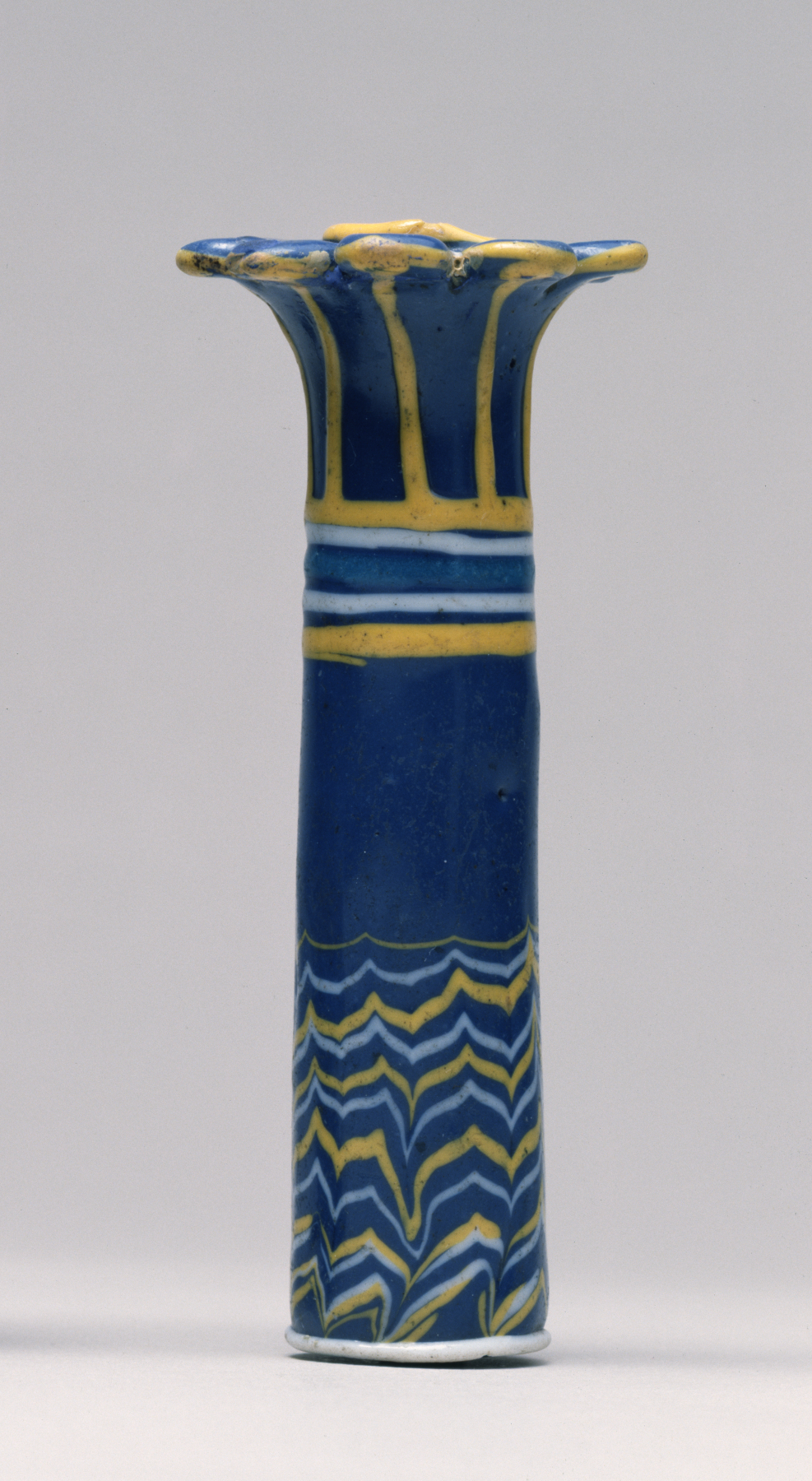
Kohl vase in the shape of a palm column; 1550–1086 BC; glass; height: 8.9 cm; Walters Art Museum (Baltimore, US)

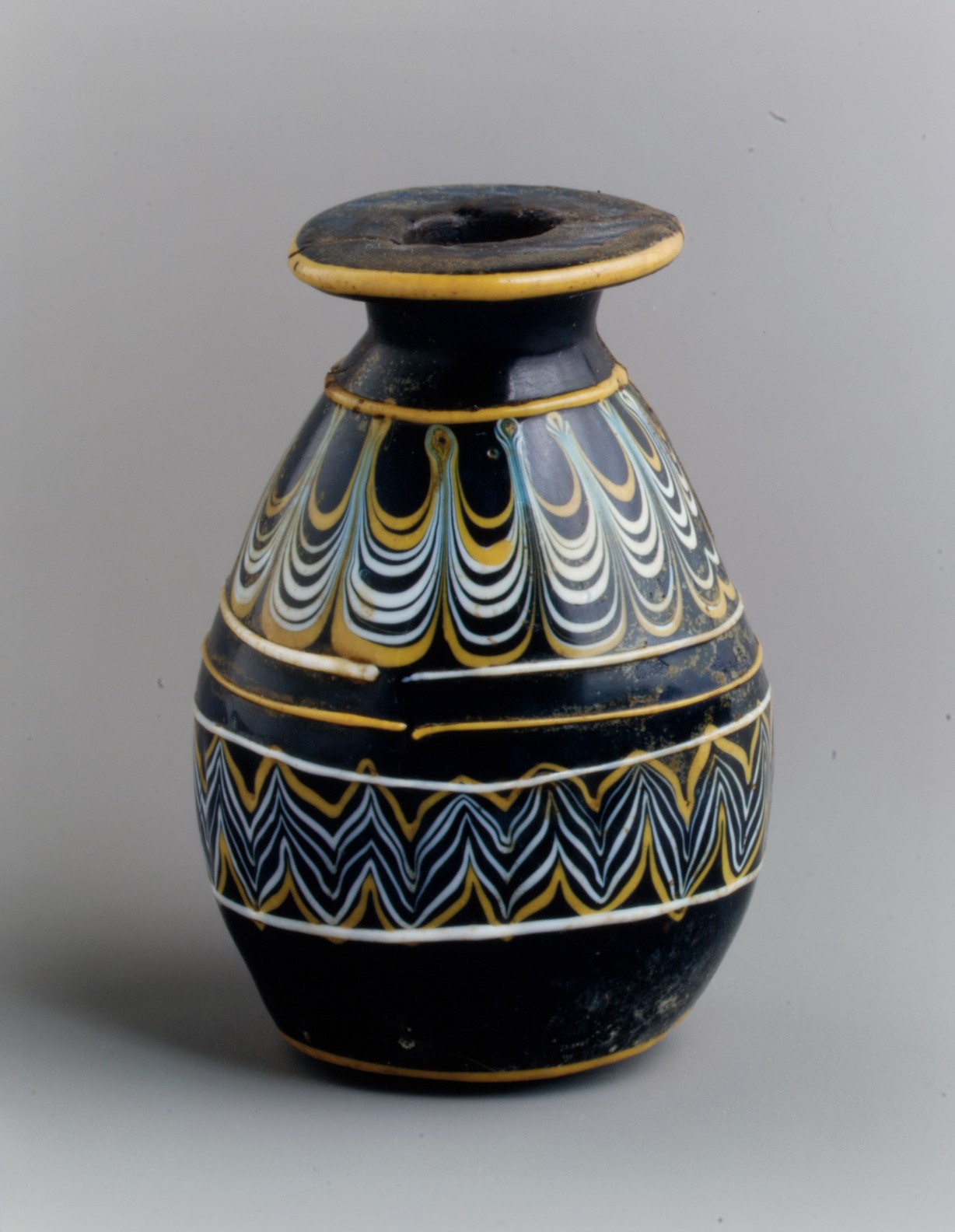
Bottle; 1353–1336 BC; glass; height: 8.1 cm; Metropolitan Museum of Art (New York City)

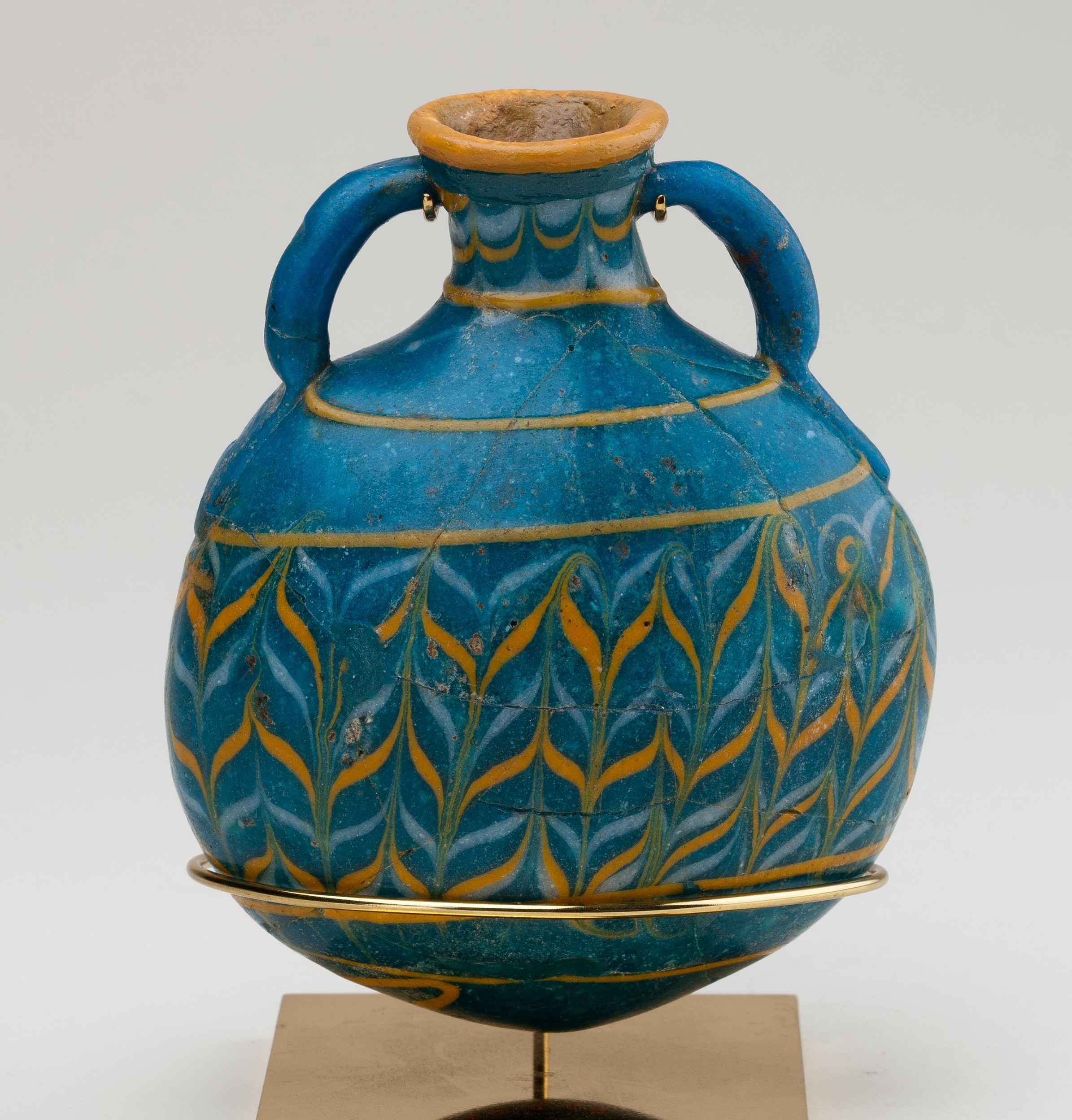
Bottle; 1295–1070 BC; glass; height: 10 cm (3.9 in); Metropolitan Museum of Art

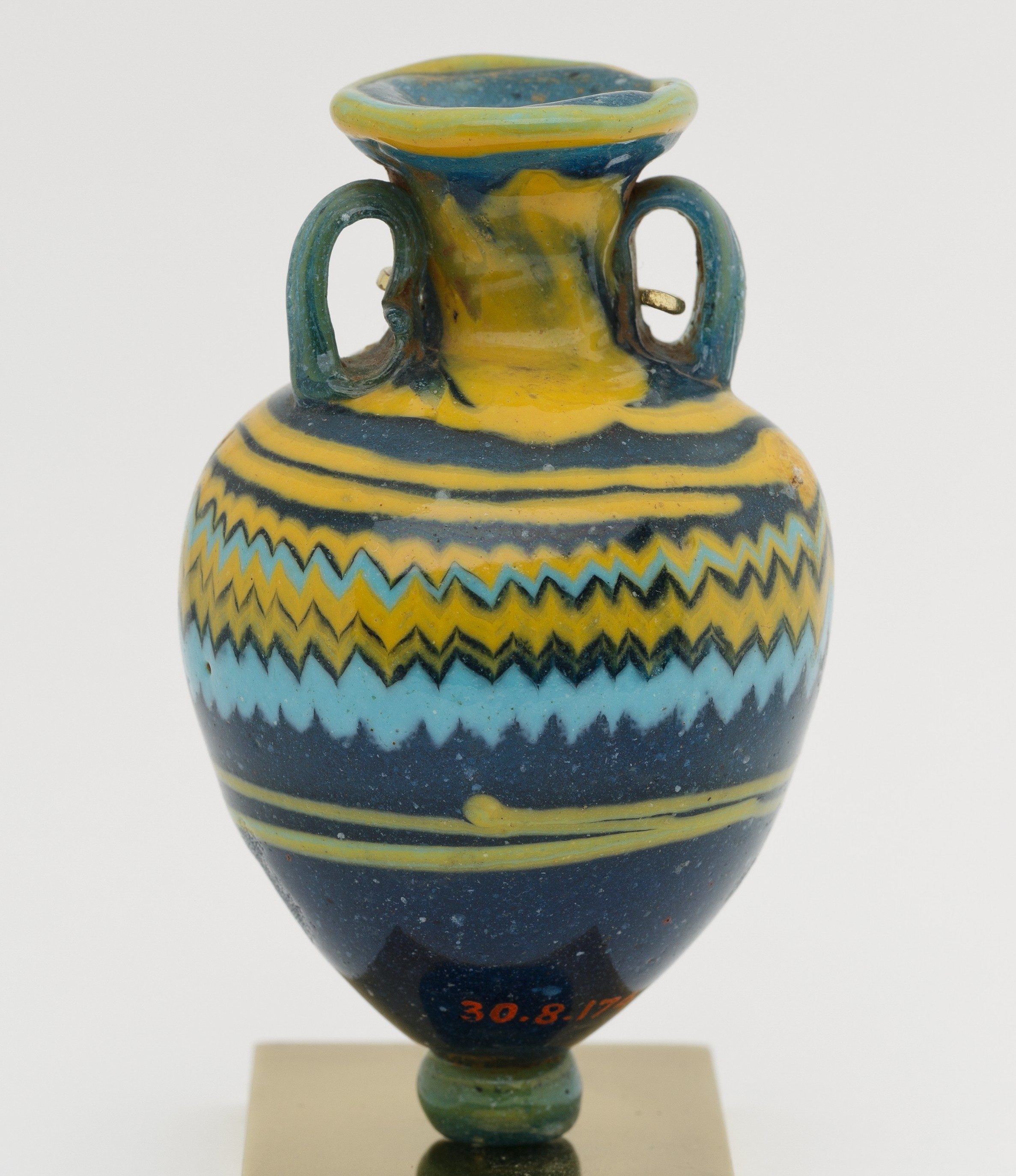
Small amphoriskos; 664–332 BC; glass; height: 7 cm (2.8 in); Metropolitan Museum of Art

=== Egyptian blue ===
Egyptian blue is a material related to, but distinct from, faience and glass. Also called "frit", Egyptian blue was made from quartz, alkali, lime and one or more coloring agents (usually copper compounds). These were heated together until they fused to become a crystalline mass of uniform color (unlike faience in which the core and the surface layer are of different colors). Egyptian blue could be worked by hand or pressed into molds, to make statuettes and other small objects. It could also be ground to produce pigment. It is first attested in the Fourth Dynasty, but became particularly popular in the Ptolemaic period and the Roman period, when it was known as caeruleum.

The color blue was used only sparingly even up until as late as Dynasty IV, where the color was found adorning mat-patterns in the Tomb of Saccara, which was constructed during the first Dynasty. Until this discovery was made, the color blue had not been known in Egyptian art.

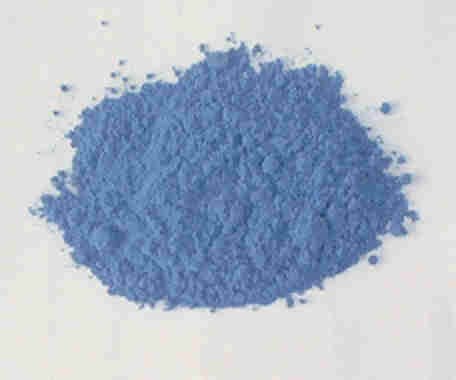
Powder of Egyptian blue

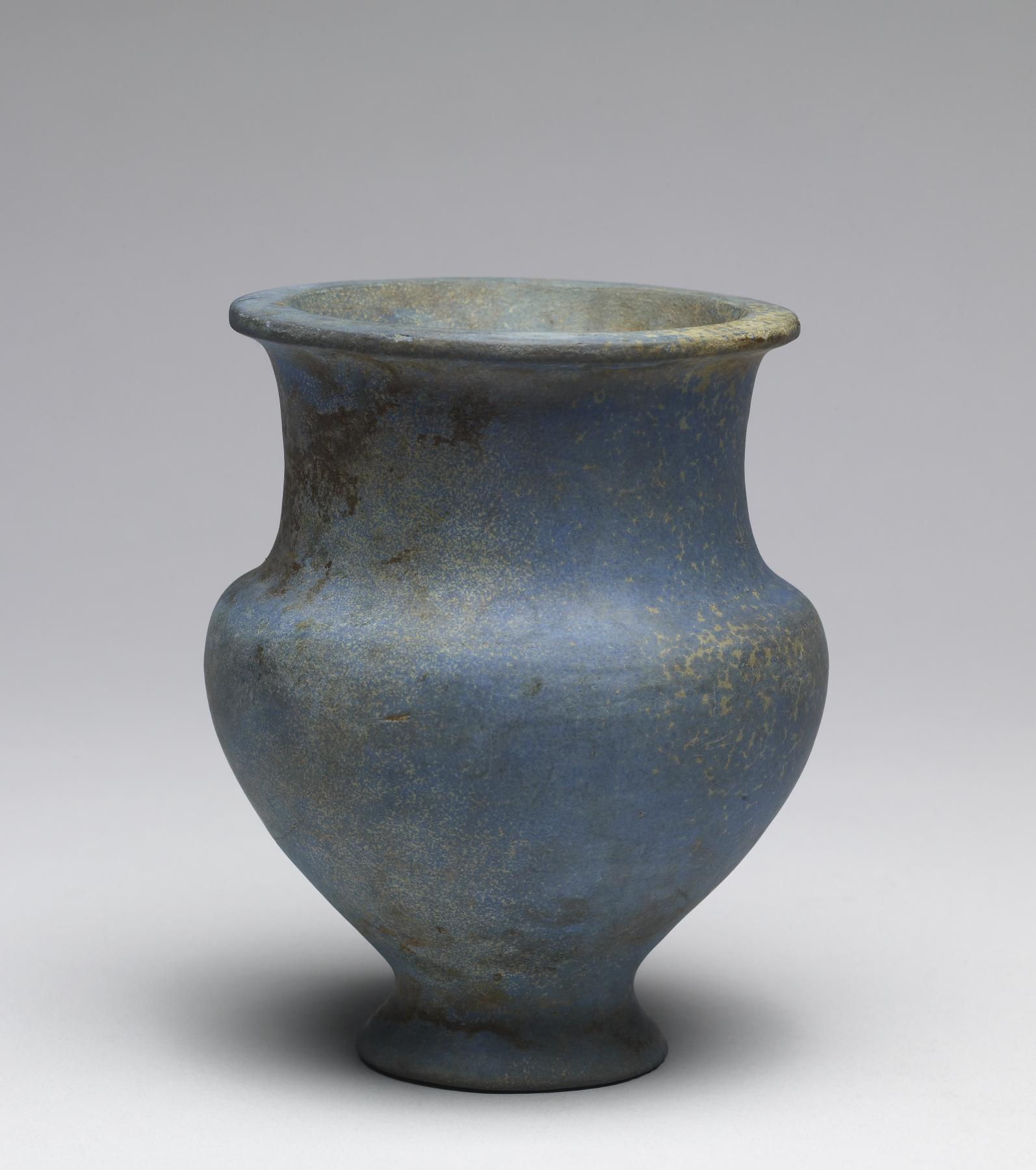
Amphora, an example of Egyptian blue ceramic ware; 1380–1300 BC; height: 12.6 cm (5.0 in); Walters Art Museum (Baltimore, US)

=== Metals ===
While not a leading center of metallurgy, ancient Egypt nevertheless developed technologies for extracting and processing the metals found within its borders and in neighbouring lands.

Copper was the first metal to be exploited in Egypt. Small beads have been found in Badarian graves; larger items were produced in the later Predynastic Period, by a combination of mould-casting, annealing and cold-hammering. The production of copper artifacts peaked in the Old Kingdom when huge numbers of copper chisels were manufactured to cut the stone blocks of pyramids. The copper statues of Pepi I and Merenre from Hierakonpolis are rare survivors of large-scale metalworking.

The golden treasure of Tutankhamun has come to symbolize the wealth of ancient Egypt, and illustrates the importance of gold in pharaonic culture. The burial chamber in a royal tomb was called "the house of gold". According to the Egyptian religion, the flesh of the gods was made of gold. A shining metal that never tarnished, it was the ideal material for cult images of deities, for royal funerary equipment, and to add brilliance to the tops of obelisks. It was used extensively for jewelry, and was distributed to officials as a reward for loyal services ("the gold of honour").

Silver had to be imported from the Levant, and its rarity initially gave it greater value than gold (which, like electrum, was readily available within the borders of Egypt and Nubia). Early examples of silverwork include the bracelets of the Hetepheres. By the Middle Kingdom, silver seems to have become less valuable than gold, perhaps because of increased trade with the Middle East. The treasure from El-Tod consisted of a hoard of silver objects, probably made in the Aegean, while silver jewelry made for female members of the 12th Dynasty royal family was found at Dahshur and Lahun. In the Egyptian religion, the bones of the gods were said to be made of silver.

Iron was the last metal to be exploited on a large scale by the Egyptians. Meteoritic iron was used for the manufacture of beads from the Badarian period. However, the advanced technology required to smelt iron was not introduced into Egypt until the Late Period. Before that, iron objects were imported and were consequently highly valued for their rarity. The Amarna letters refer to diplomatic gifts of iron being sent by Near Eastern rulers, especially the Hittites, to Amenhotep III and Akhenaten. Iron tools and weapons only became common in Egypt in the Roman Period.

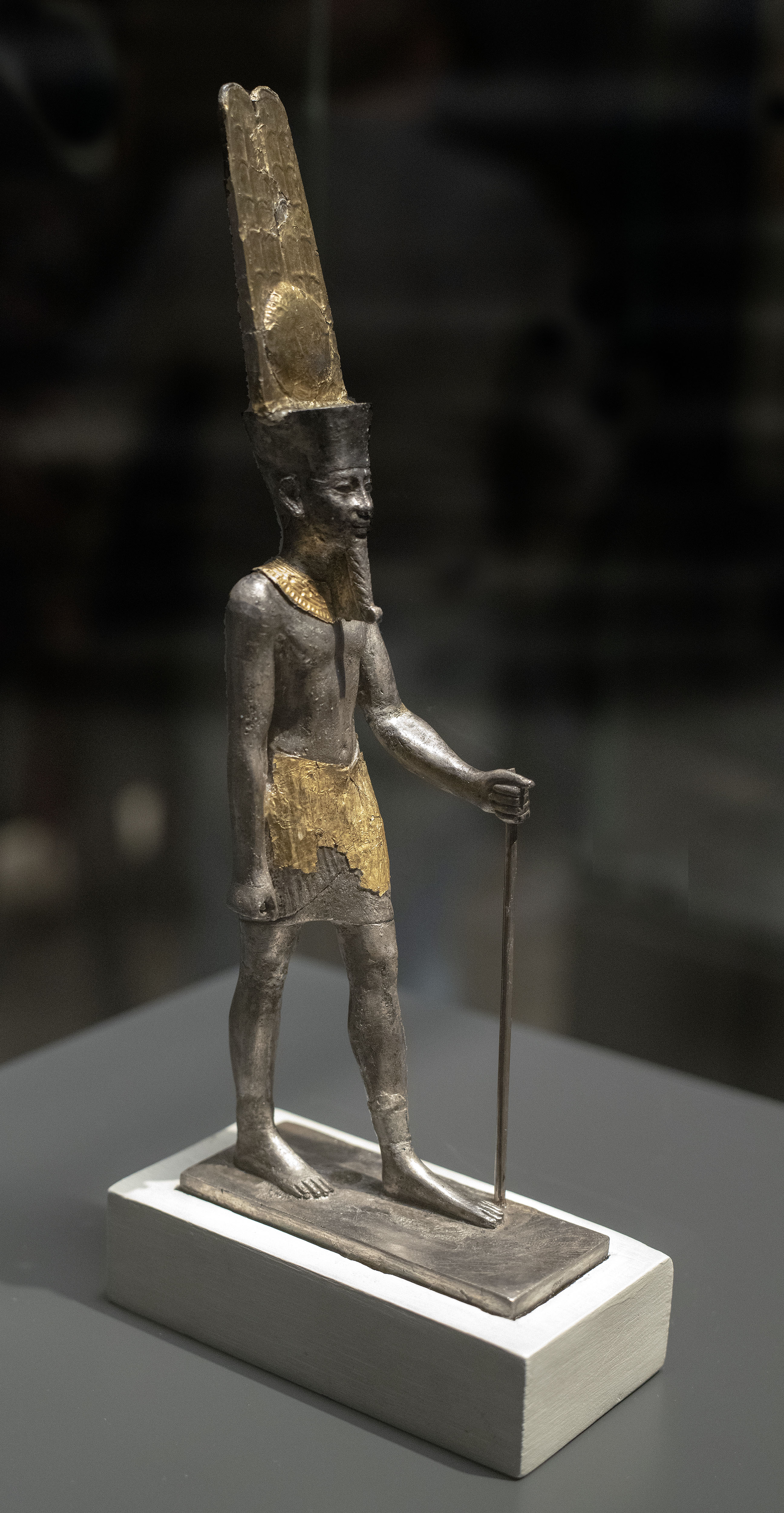
Amun-Ra figurine; 1069–664 BC; silver and gold; 24 × 6 × 8.5 cm, 0.7 kg; British Museum (London)

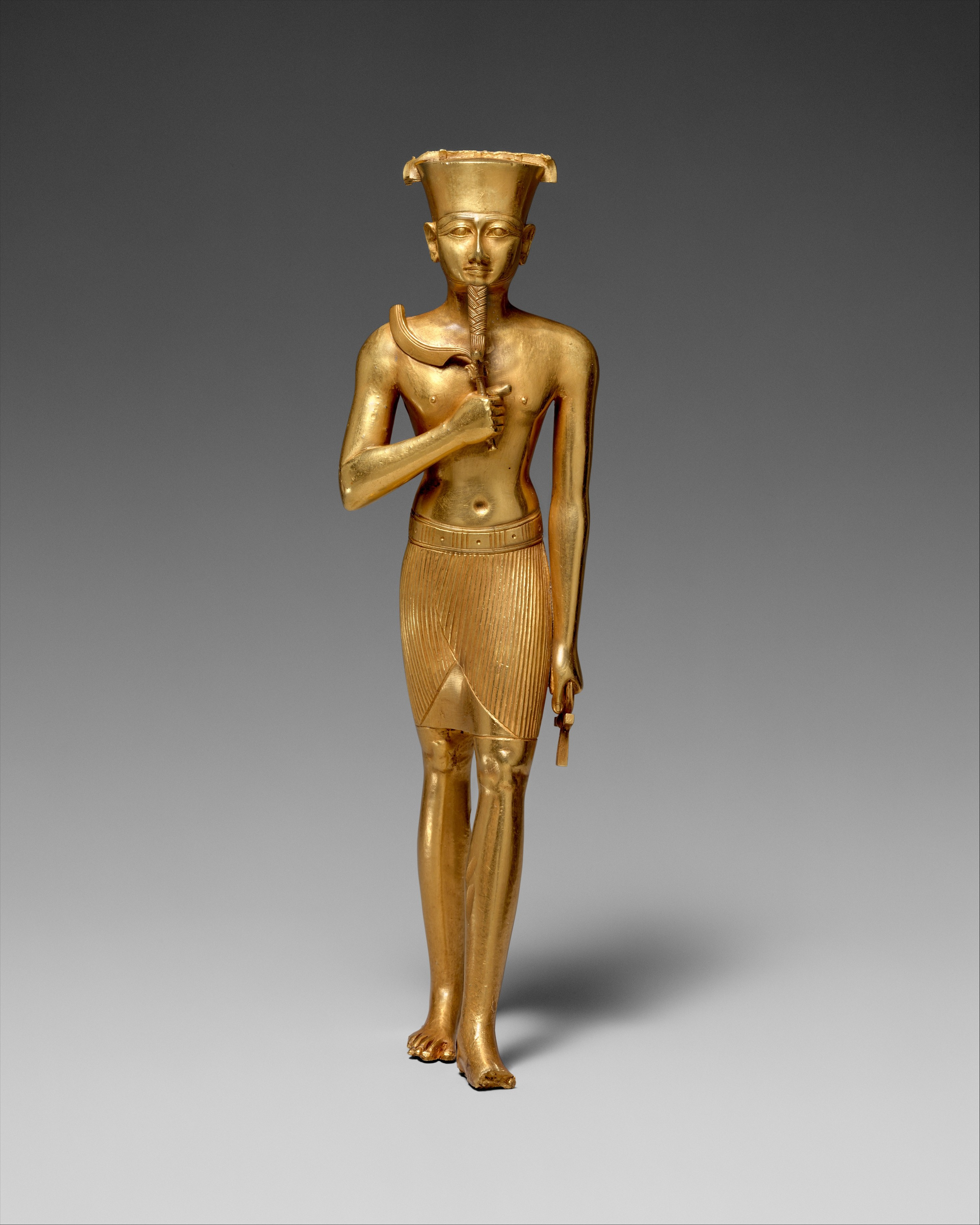
Statuette of Amun; 945–715 BC; gold; 17.5 × 4.7 cm; Metropolitan Museum of Art (New York City)

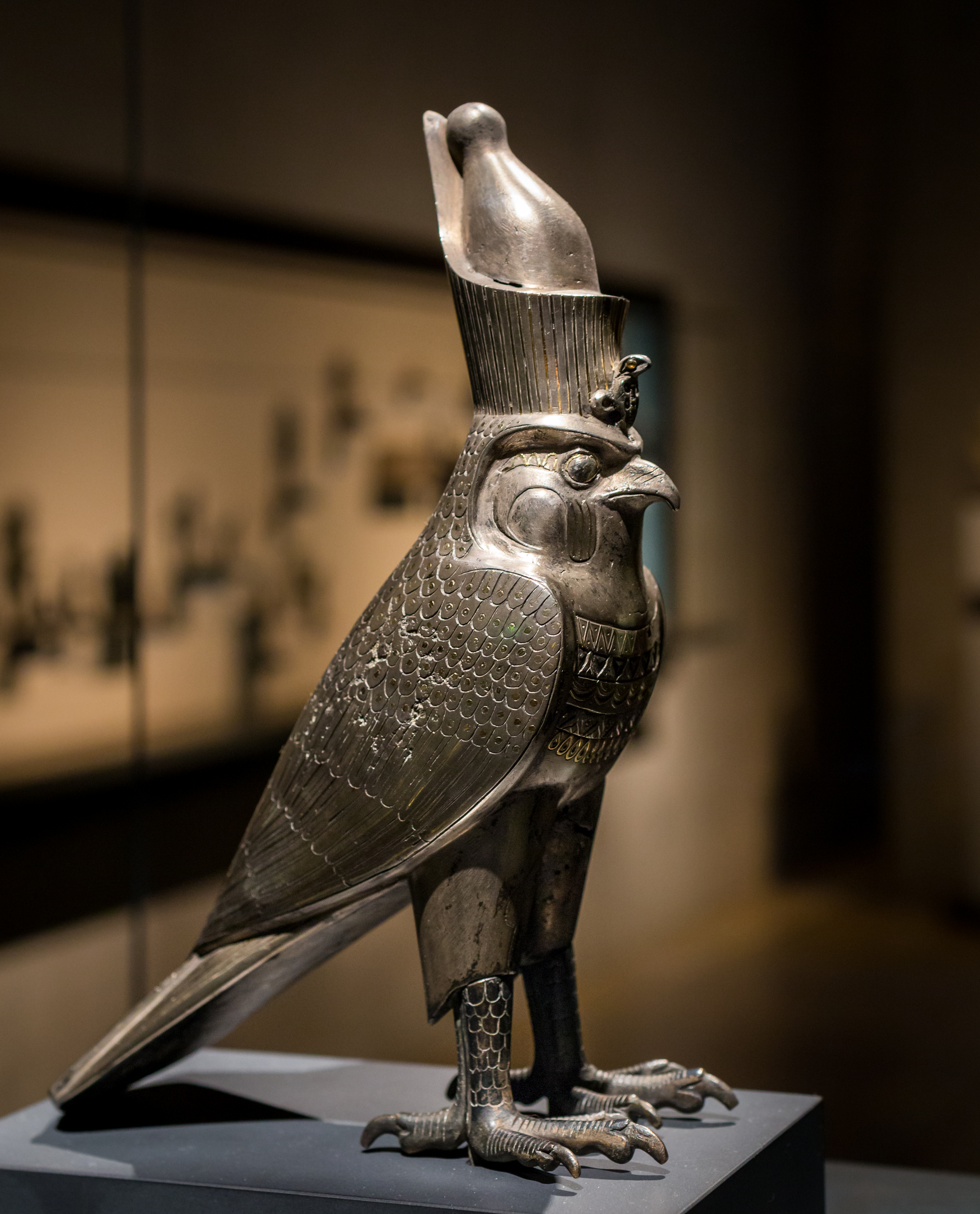
Figurine of Horus as falcon god with an Egyptian crown; circa 500 BC; silver and electrum; height: 26.9 cm; Staatliche Sammlung für Ägyptische Kunst (Munich, Germany)

Statuette of Isis and Horus; 305–30 BC; solid cast of bronze; 4.8 × 10.3 cm; Cleveland Museum of Art (Cleveland, Ohio, US)

=== Wood ===
Because of its relatively poor survival in archaeological contexts, wood is not particularly well represented among artifacts from Ancient Egypt. Nevertheless, woodworking was evidently carried out to a high standard from an early period. Native trees included date palm and dom palm, the trunks of which could be used as joists in buildings, or split to produce planks. Tamarisk, acacia and sycamore fig were employed in furniture manufacture, while ash was used when greater flexibility was required (for example in the manufacture of bowls). However, all these native timbers were of relatively poor quality; finer varieties had to be imported, especially from the Levant.

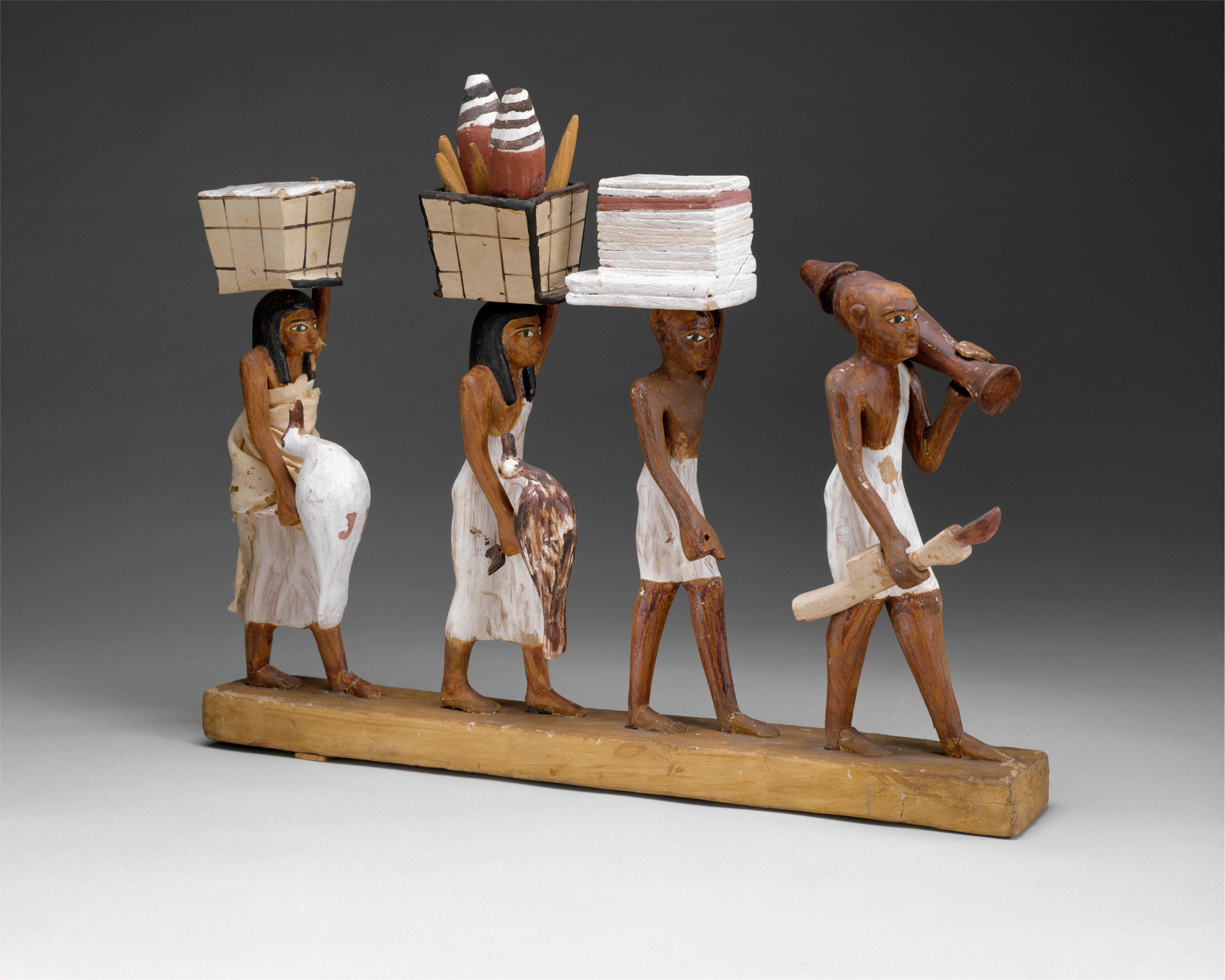
Model of a procession of offering bearers. Metropolitan Museum of Art (New York City)

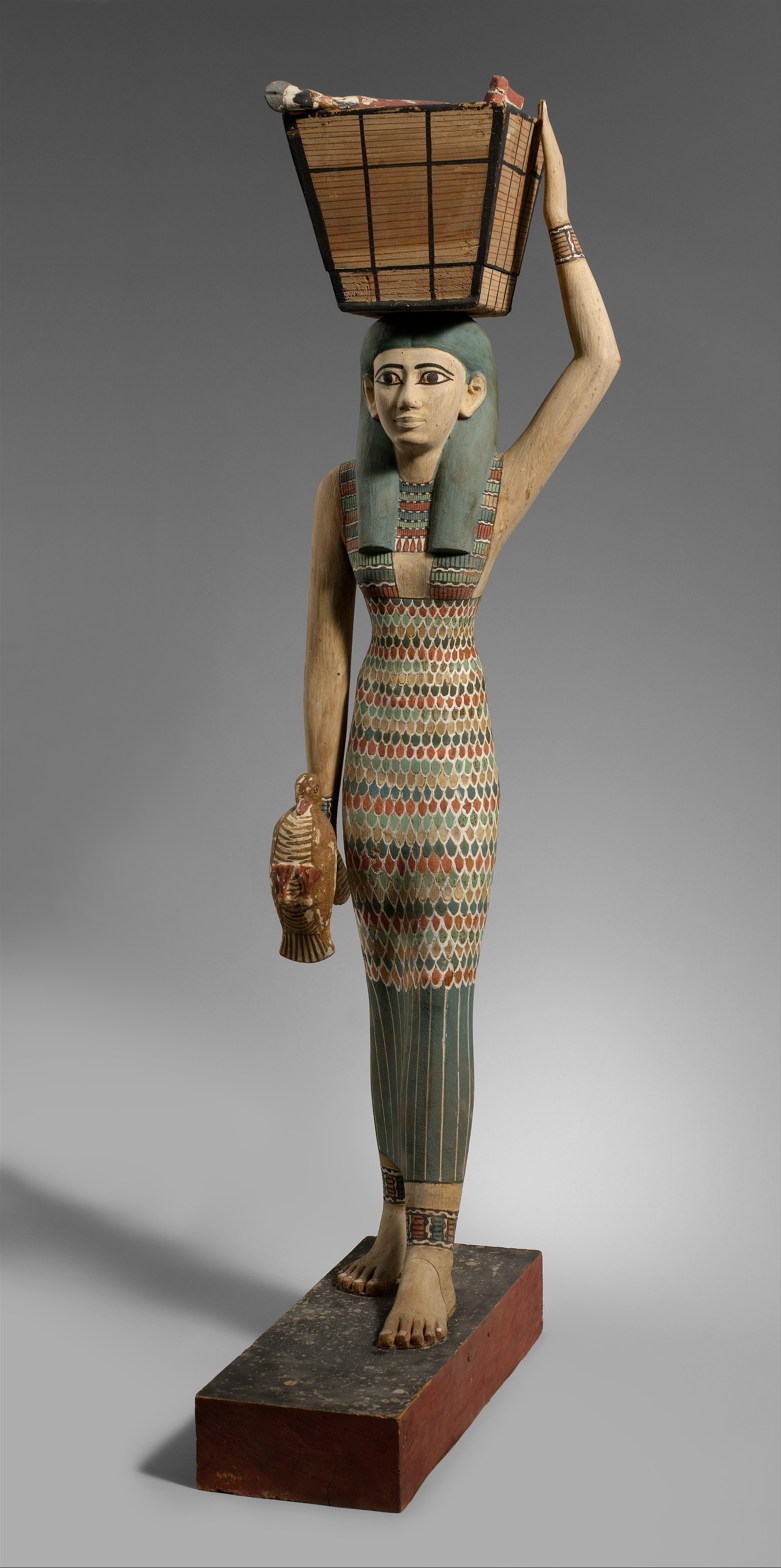
Figurine of a female servant carrying provisions; 1981–1975 BC; painted wood and gesso; 112 × 17 cm; Metropolitan Museum of Art (New York City)

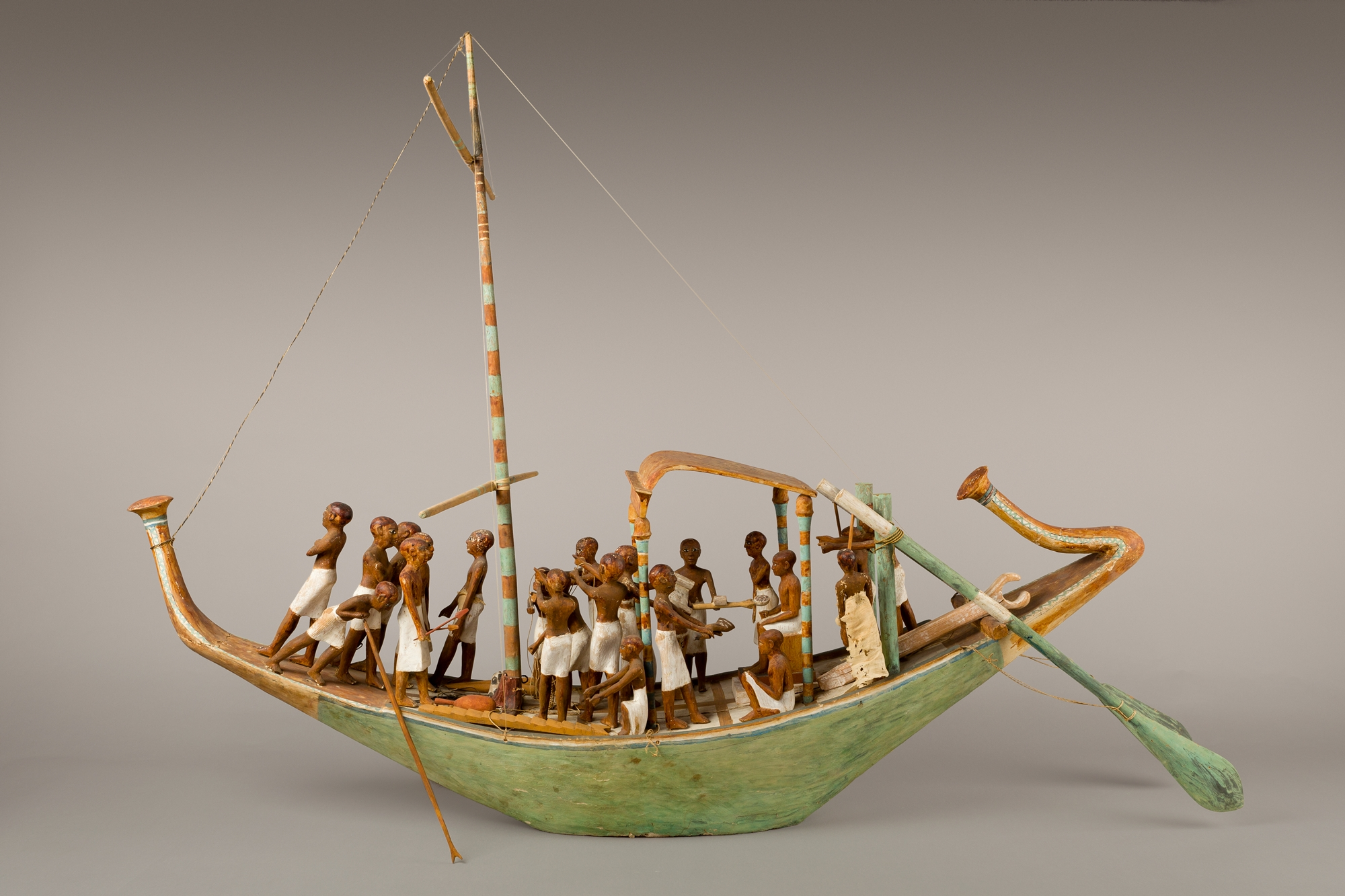
Model of a sailboat; 1981–1975 BC; painted wood, plaster, linen twine and linen fabric; length: 145 cm; Metropolitan Museum of Art

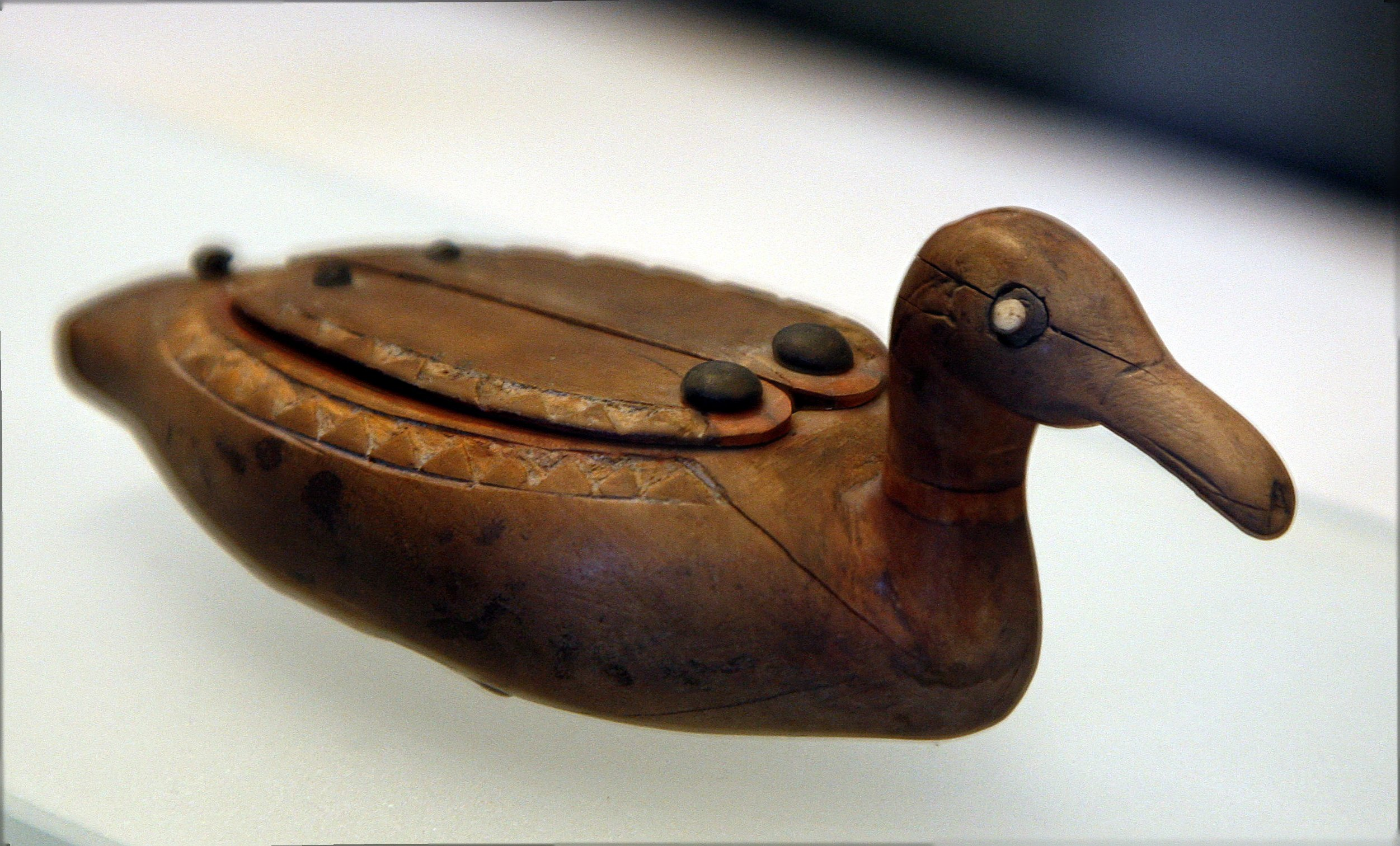
Duck-shaped box; 16th–11th century BC; wood and ivory; Louvre

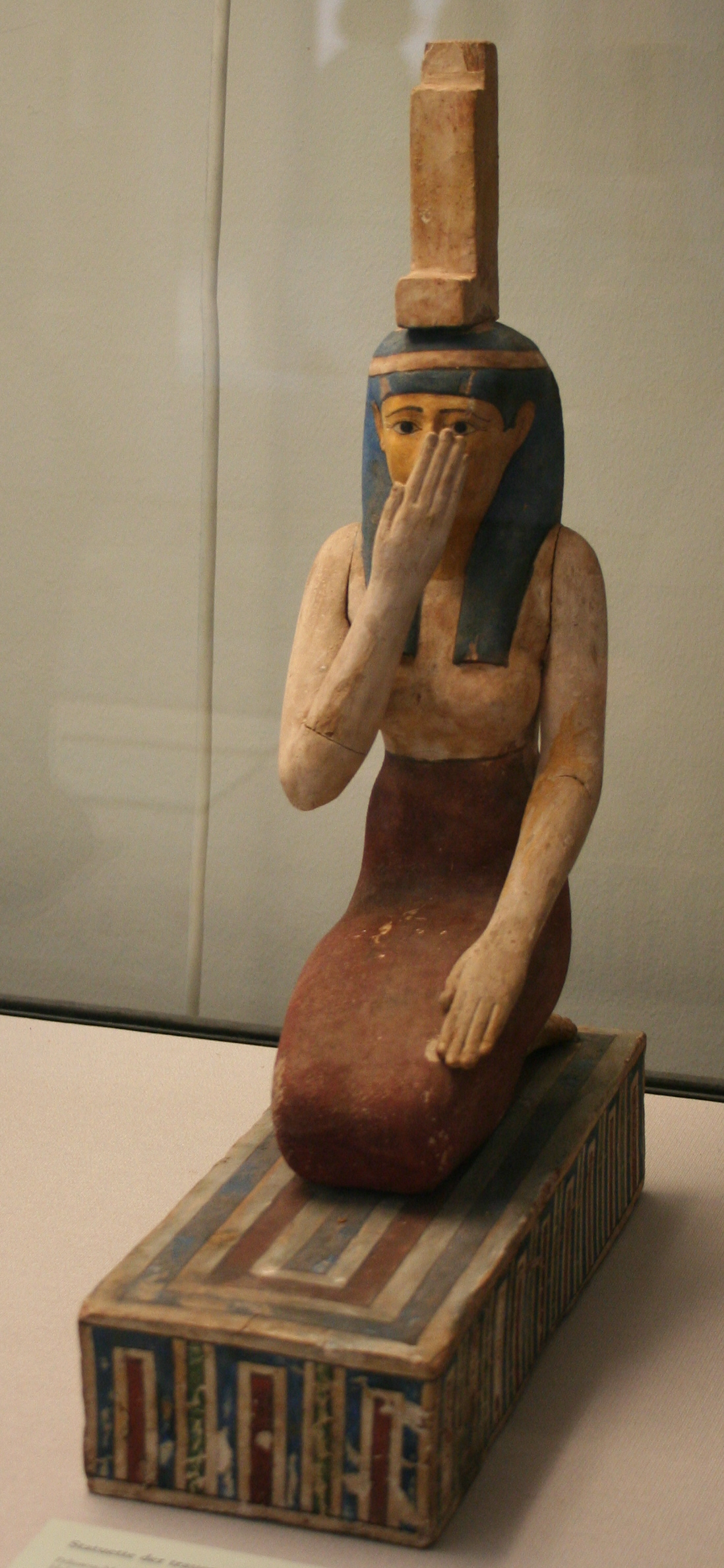
Figurine of Isis; Ptolemaic dynasty; painted wood and stucco; height: 40.5 cm; Roemer- und Pelizaeus-Museum Hildesheim (Hildesheim, Germany)

=== Lapis lazuli ===
Lapis lazuli is a dark blue semi-precious stone highly valued by the ancient Egyptians because of its symbolic association with the heavens. It was imported via long-distance trade routes from the mountains of north-eastern Afghanistan, and was considered superior to all other materials except gold and silver. Coloured glass or faience provided a cheap imitation. Lapis lazuli is first attested in the Predynastic Period. A temporary interruption in supply during the Second and Third Dynasties probably reflects political changes in the ancient Near East. Thereafter, it was used extensively for jewelry, small figurines and amulets.

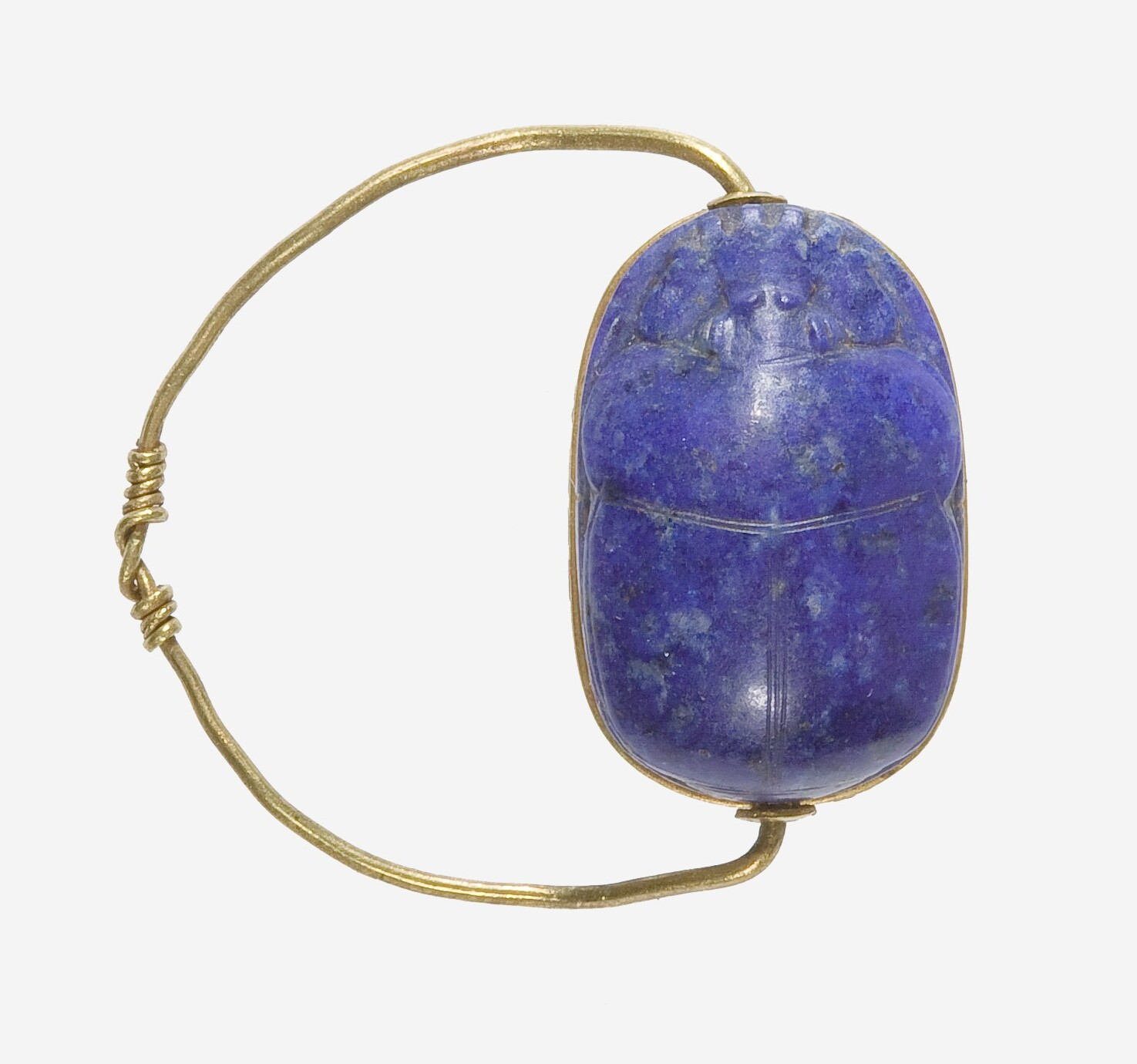
Scarab finger ring; 1850–1750 BC; diameter: 2.5 cm, the scarab: 1.8 cm; Metropolitan Museum of Art (New York City)

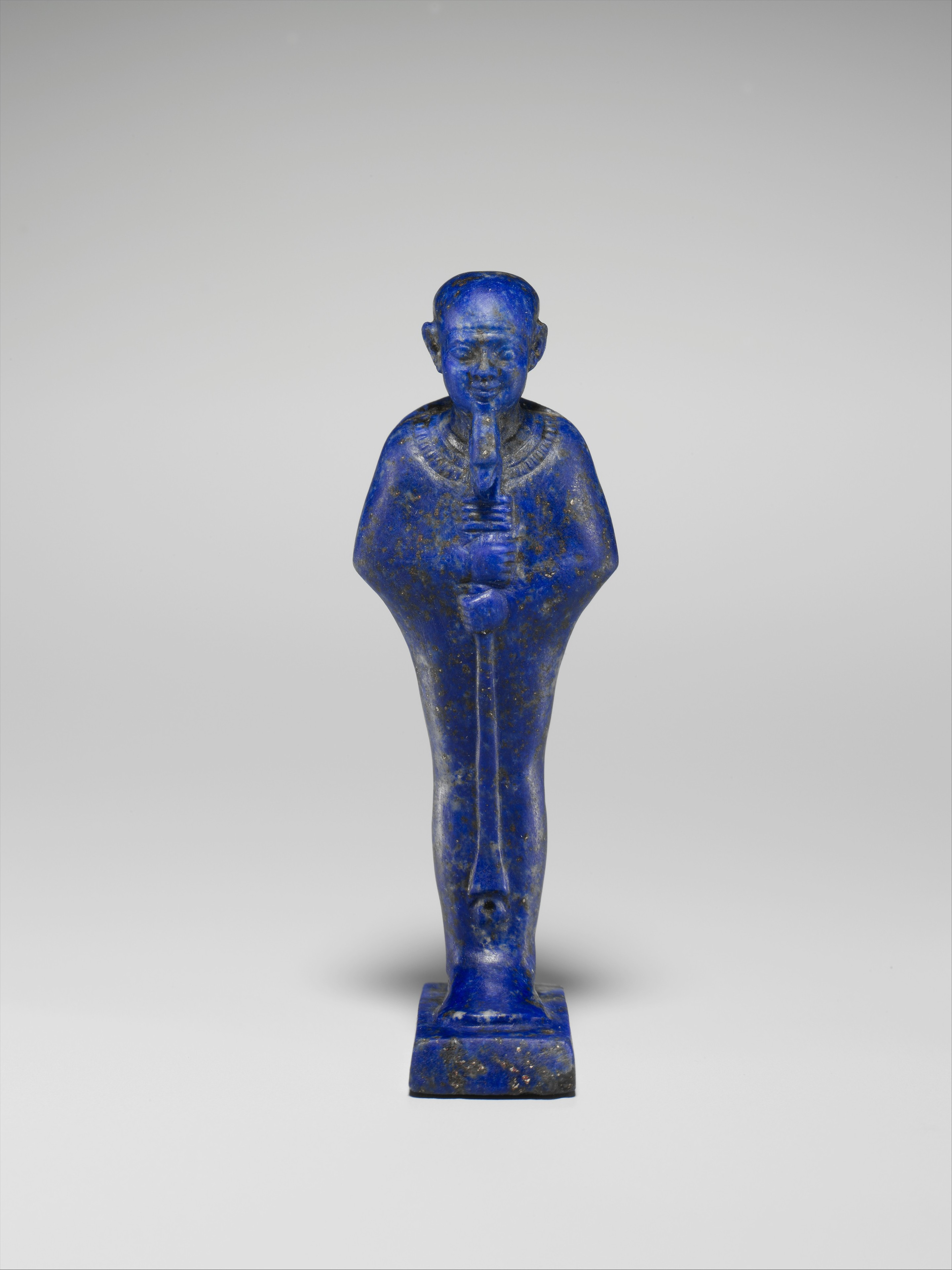
Cult image of Ptah; 945–600 BC; height of the figure: 5.2 cm, height of the dais: 0.4 cm; Metropolitan Museum of Art

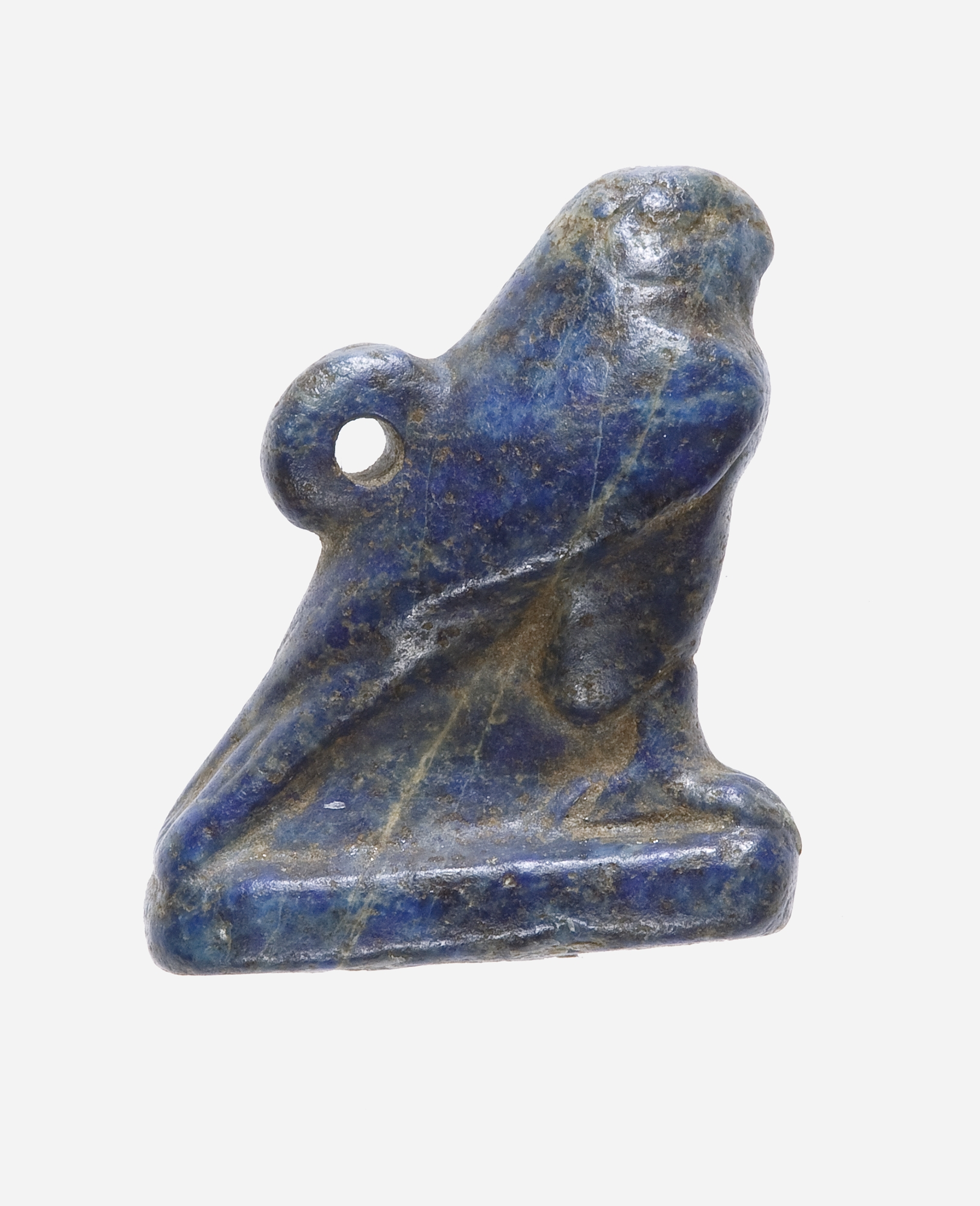
Falcom amulet; 664–332 BC; height: 2.2 cm; Metropolitan Museum of Art

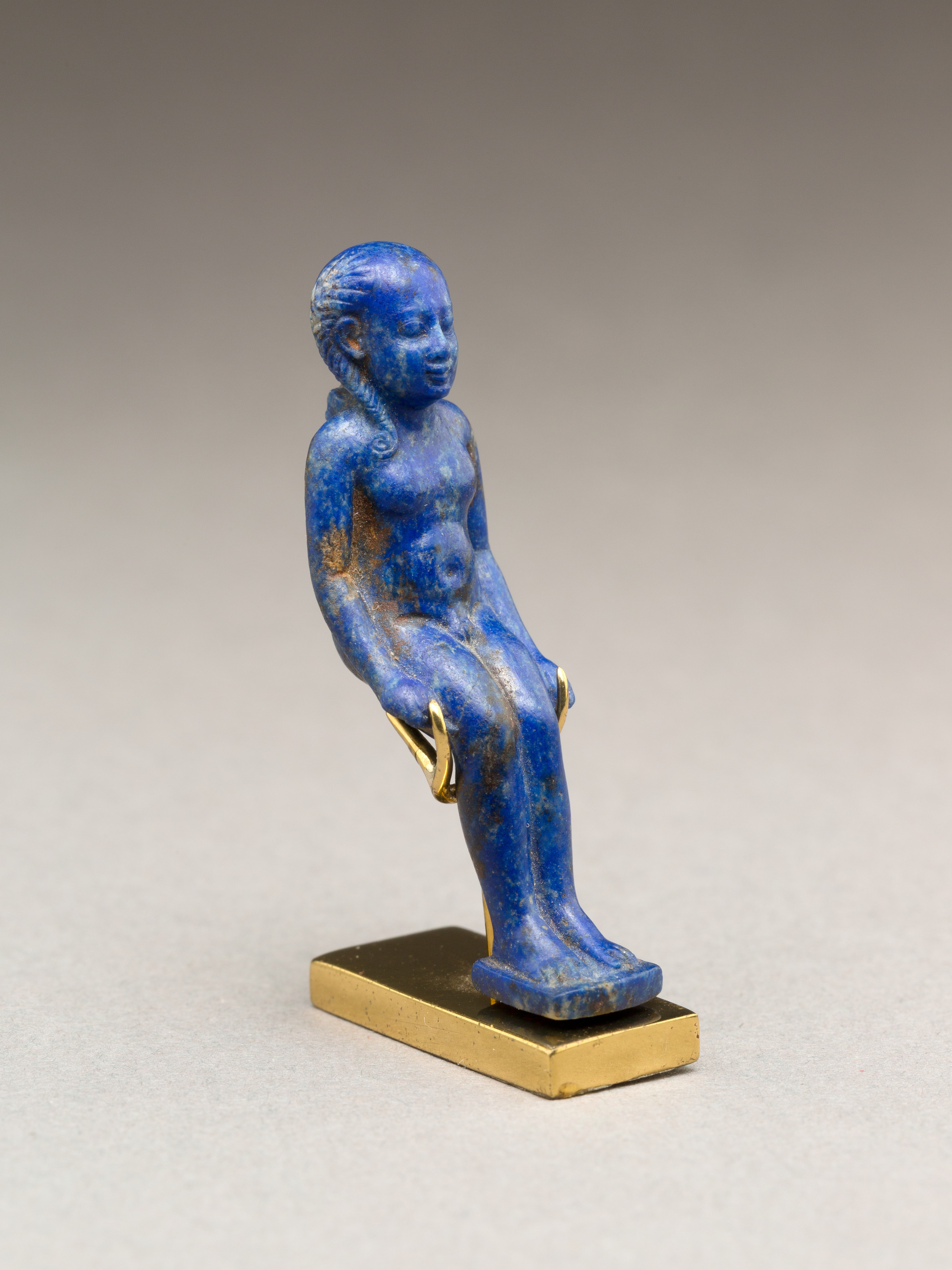
Child god (Harpokrates?) amulet; 664–30 BC; height: 4.3 cm, width: 1.2 cm, depth: 1.6 cm; Metropolitan Museum of Art

=== Other materials ===
- Jasper is an impure form of chalcedony with bands or patches of red, green or yellow. Red jasper, symbol of life and of positive aspects of the universe, was used above all to make amulets. It was ideal for certain amulets, such as the tit amulet, or tyet (also known as knot of Isis), to be made of red jasper, as specified in Spell 156 of the Book of the Dead. The more rarely used green jasper was especially indicated for making scarabs, particularly heart scarabs.
- Serpentine is the generic term for the hydrated silicates of magnesium. It came mostly from the eastern desert, and occurs in many shades of color, from a pale green to a dark verging on black. Used from the earliest times, it was sought specially for making heart scarabs.
- Steatite (also known as soapstone) is a mineral of the chlorite family; it has the great advantage of being very easy to work. Steatite amulets are found in contexts from the Predynastic Period on, although in subsequent periods it was usually covered in a fine layer of faience and was used in the manufacture of numerous scarabs.
- Turquoise is an opaque stone, sky blue to blue-green. It is a natural aluminium phosphate colored blue by traces of copper. Closely linked to the goddess Hathor, it was extracted mainly from mines in Sinai (at Serabit el-Khadim). The Egyptians were particularly fond of the greenish shades, symbolic of dynamism and vital renewal. In the Late Period, turquoise (like lapis lazuli) was synonymous with joy and delight.
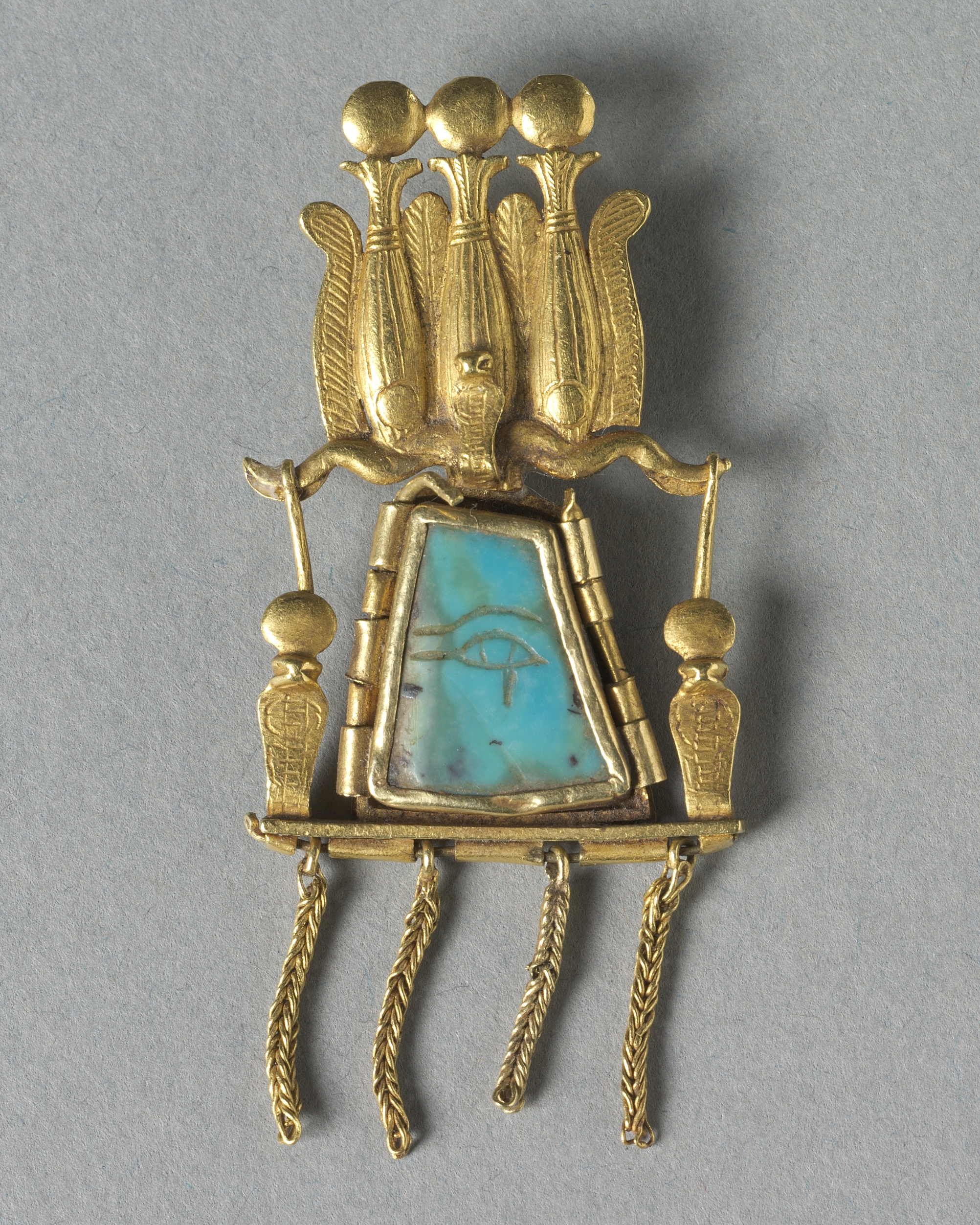
Pendant; circa 1069 BC; gold and turquoise; overall: 5.1 x 2.3 cm; Cleveland Museum of Art (Cleveland, USA)

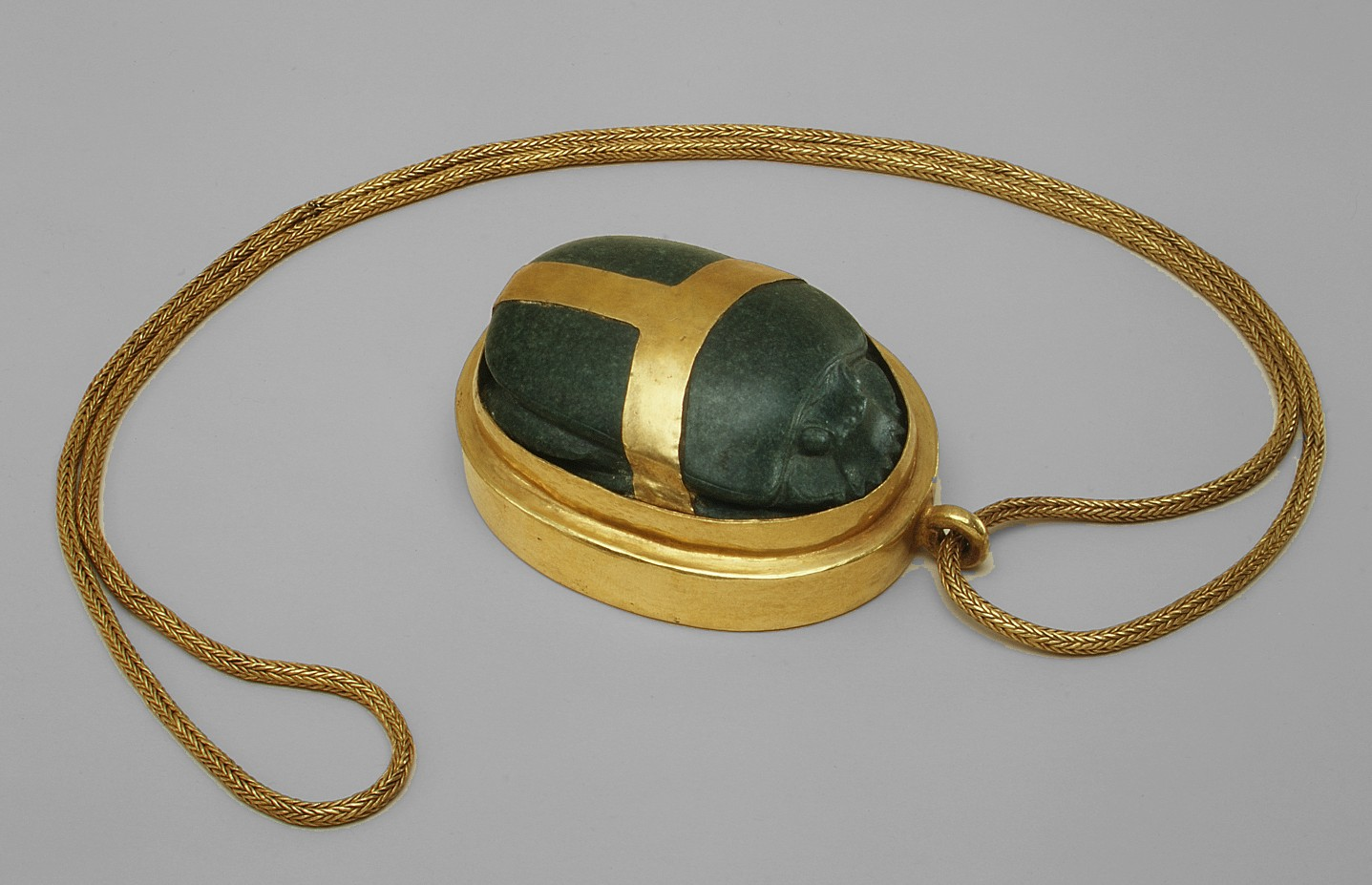
Heart scarab of Hatnefer; 1492–1473 BC; serpentine (the scarab) and gold; 5.3 × 2.8 cm; chain: 77.5 cm; Metropolitan Museum of Art

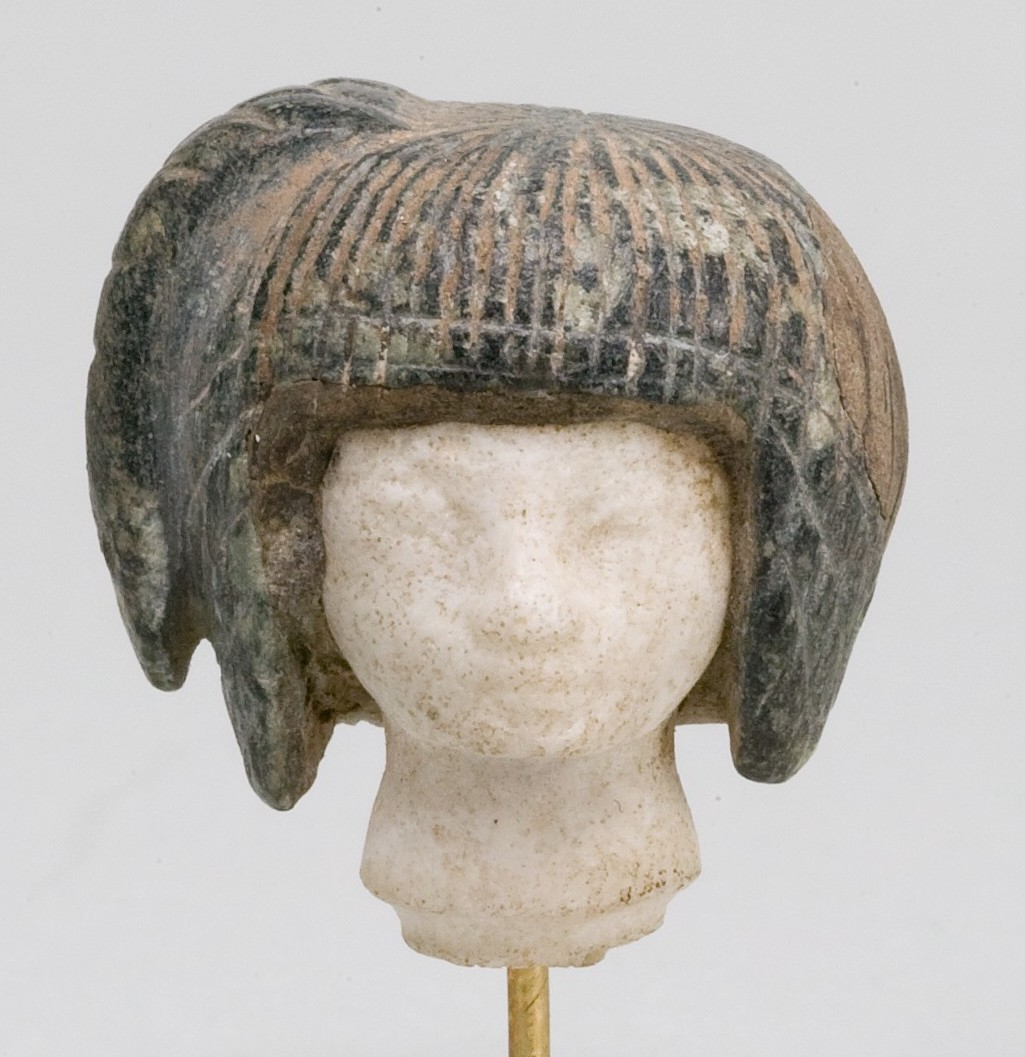
Head from a spoon in the form of a swimming girl; 1390–1353 BC; travertine (the head) and steatite (the hair); 2.8 × 2.7 cm; Metropolitan Museum of Art

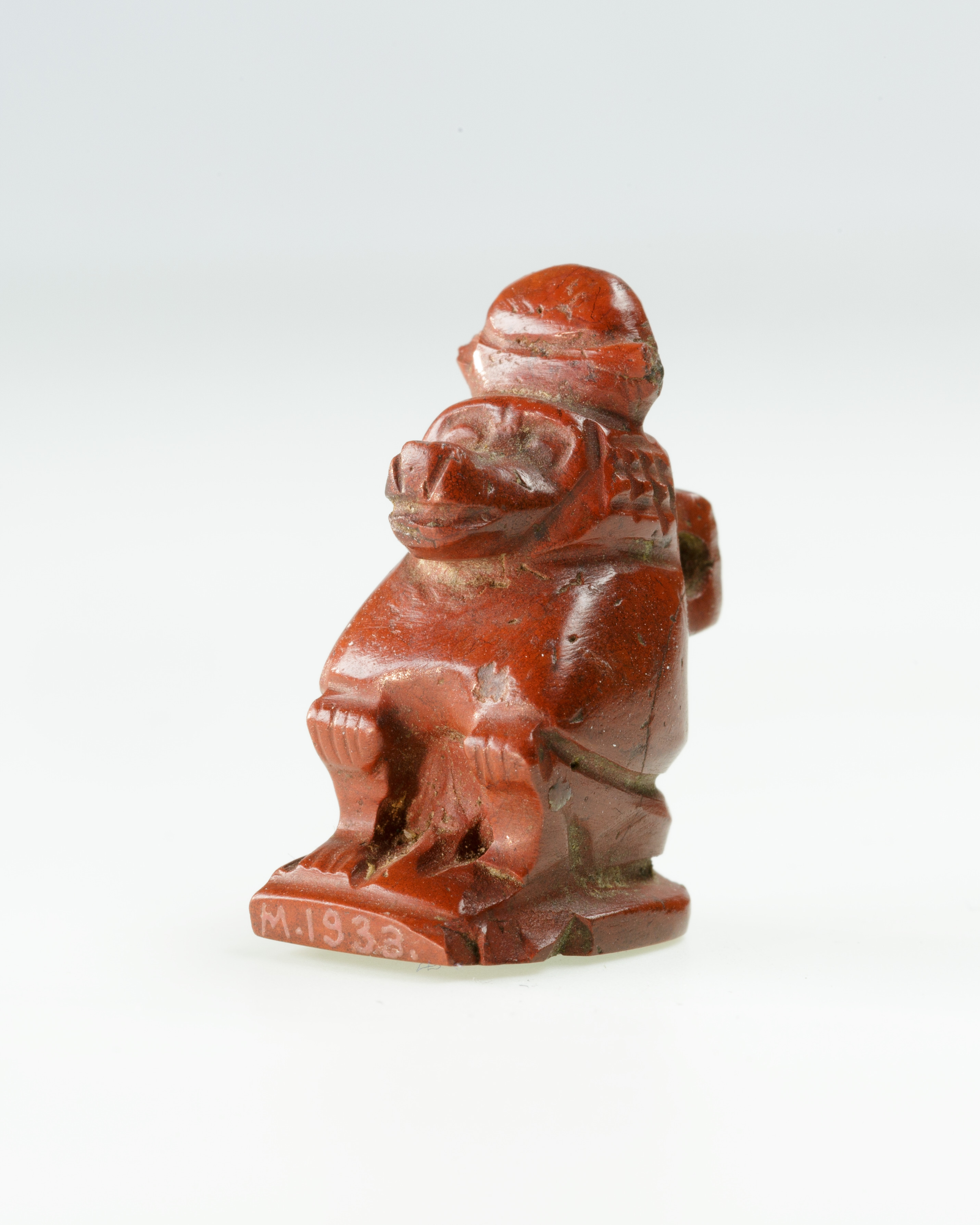
Amulet; 1295–1070 BC; red jasper; 2.3 × 1.2 cm; Metropolitan Museum of Art

== Sculpture ==
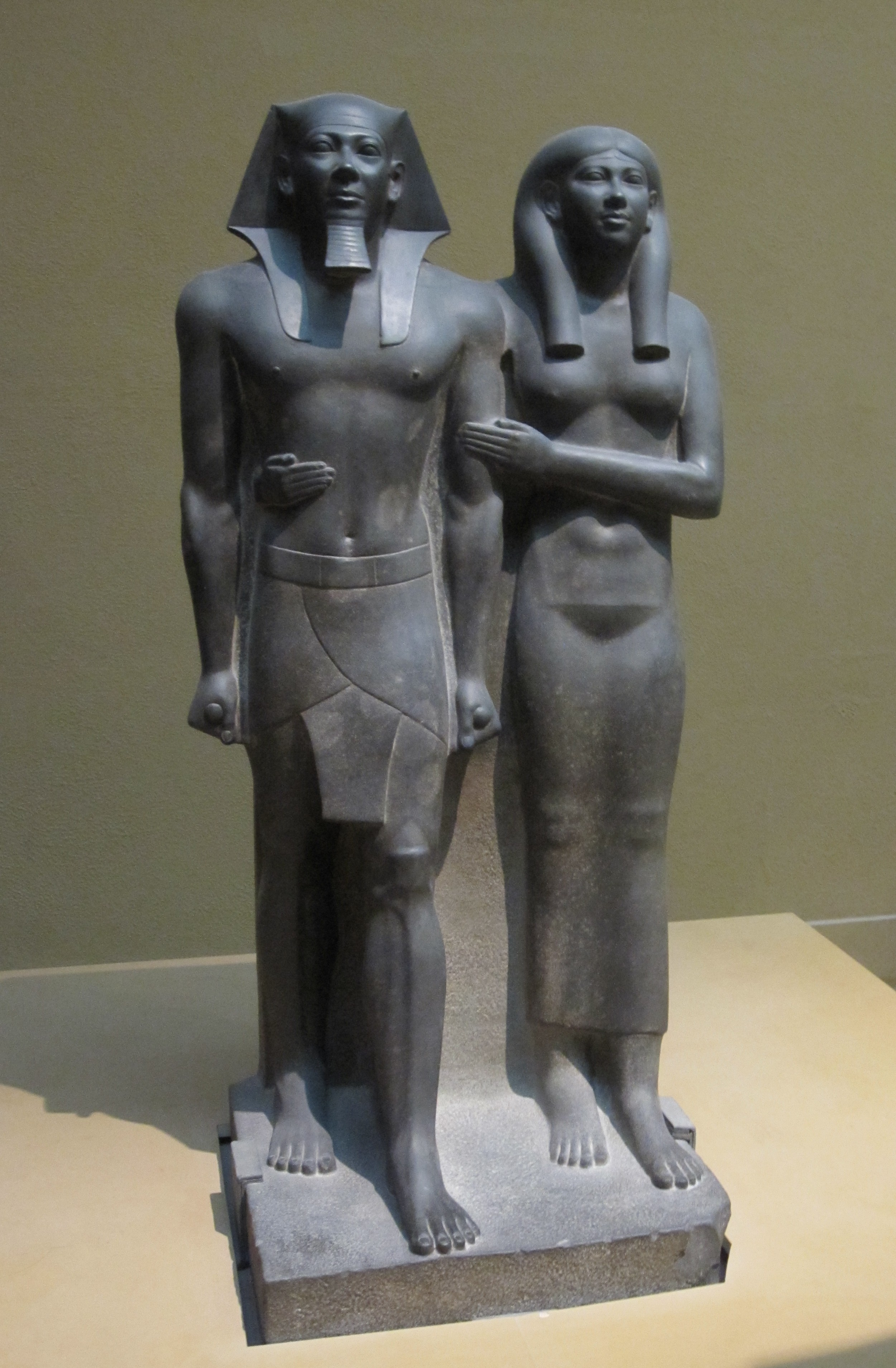
Pharaoh Menkaura and queen Khamerernebty II; 2490–2472 BC; greywacke; overall: 142.2 cm × 57.1 cm × 55.2 cm (56.0 in × 22.5 in × 21.7 in); Museum of Fine Arts, Boston (US)

The monumental sculpture of ancient Egypt's temples and tombs is well known, but refined and delicate small works exist in much greater numbers. The Egyptians used the technique of sunk relief, which is best viewed in sunlight for the outlines and forms to be emphasized by shadows. The distinctive pose of standing statues facing forward with one foot in front of the other was helpful for the balance and strength of the piece. This singular pose was used early in the history of Egyptian art and well into the Ptolemaic period, although seated statues were common as well.

Egyptian pharaohs were always regarded as gods, but other deities are much less common in large statues, except when they represent the pharaoh as another deity; however, the other deities are frequently shown in paintings and reliefs. The famous row of four colossal statues outside the main temple at Abu Simbel each show Rameses II, a typical scheme, though here exceptionally large. Most larger sculptures survived from Egyptian temples or tombs; massive statues were built to represent gods and pharaohs and their queens, usually for open areas in or outside temples. The very early colossal Great Sphinx of Giza was never repeated, but avenues lined with very large statues including sphinxes and other animals formed part of many temple complexes. The most sacred cult image of a god in a temple, usually held in the naos, was in the form of a relatively small boat or barque holding an image of the god, and apparently usually in precious metal – none of these are known to have survived.

By Dynasty IV (2680–2565 BC), the idea of the Ka statue was firmly established. These were put in tombs as a resting place for the ka portion of the soul, and so there is a good number of less conventionalized statues of well-off administrators and their wives, many in wood as Egypt is one of the few places in the world where the climate allows wood to survive over millennia, and many block statues. The so-called reserve heads, plain hairless heads, are especially naturalistic, though the extent to which there was real portraiture in ancient Egypt is still debated.

Early tombs also contained small models of the slaves, animals, buildings and objects such as boats (and later ushabti figures) necessary for the deceased to continue his lifestyle in the afterlife. However, the great majority of wooden sculpture have been lost to decay, or probably used as fuel. Small figures of deities, or their animal personifications, are very common, and found in popular materials such as pottery. There were also large numbers of small carved objects, from figures of the gods to toys and carved utensils. Alabaster was used for expensive versions of these, though painted wood was the most common material, and was normal for the small models of animals, slaves and possessions placed in tombs to provide for the afterlife.

Very strict conventions were followed while crafting statues, and specific rules governed the appearance of every Egyptian god. For example, the sky god (Horus) was to be represented with a falcon's head, the god of funeral rites (Anubis) was to be shown with a jackal's head. Artistic works were ranked according to their compliance with these conventions, and the conventions were followed so strictly that, over three thousand years, the appearance of statues changed very little. These conventions were intended to convey the timeless and non-ageing quality of the figure's ka.

A common relief in ancient Egyptian sculpture was the difference between the representation of men and women. Women were often represented in an idealistic form, young and pretty, and rarely shown in an older maturity. Men were shown in either an idealistic manner or a more realistic depiction. Sculptures of men often showed men that aged, since the regeneration of ageing was a positive thing for them whereas women are shown as perpetually young.

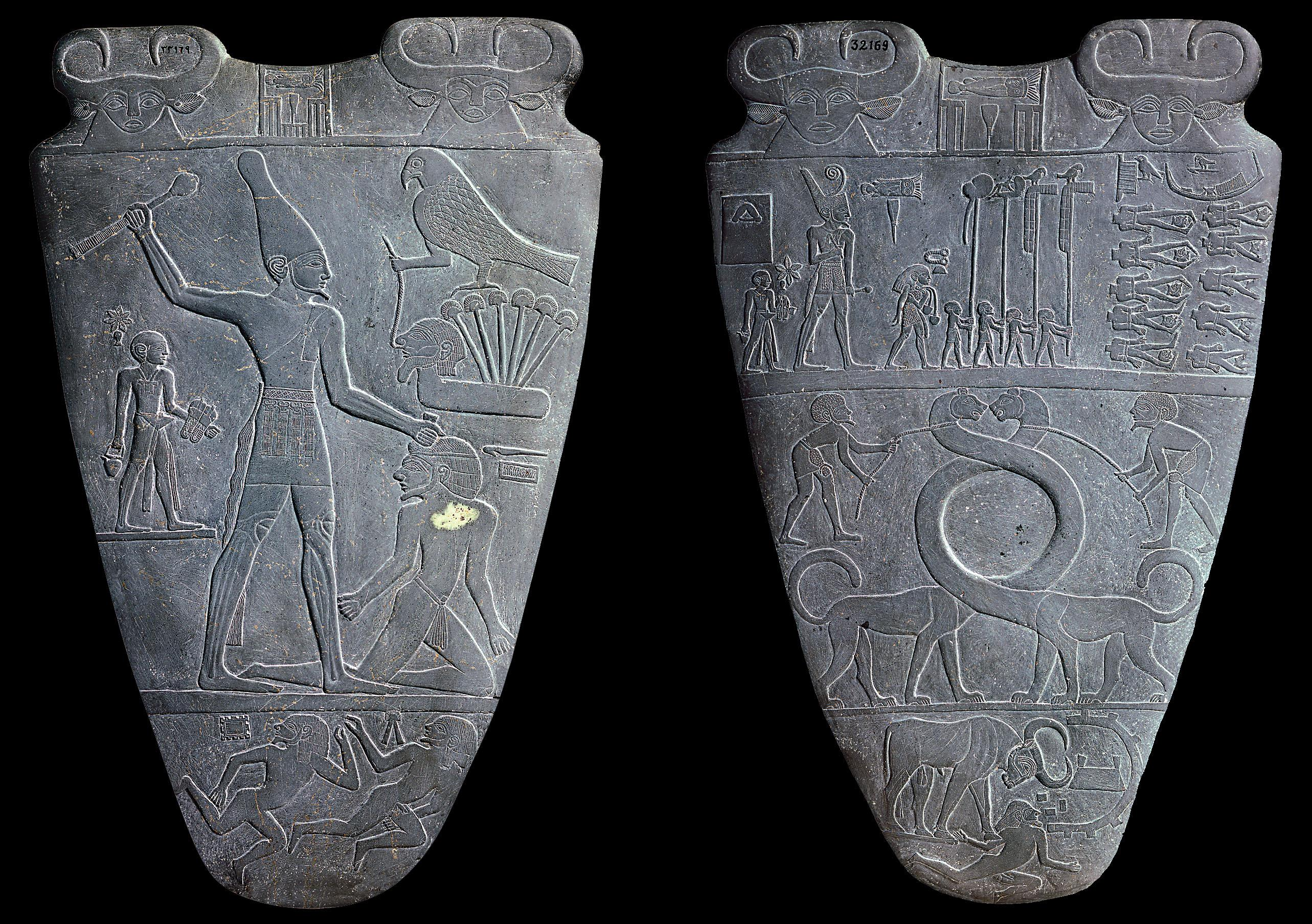
Both sides of the Narmer Palette; c. 3100 BC; greywacke; height: 63 cm; from Hierakonpolis (Egypt); Egyptian Museum (Cairo). This very old palette shows the canonical Egyptian profile view and proportions of the figure

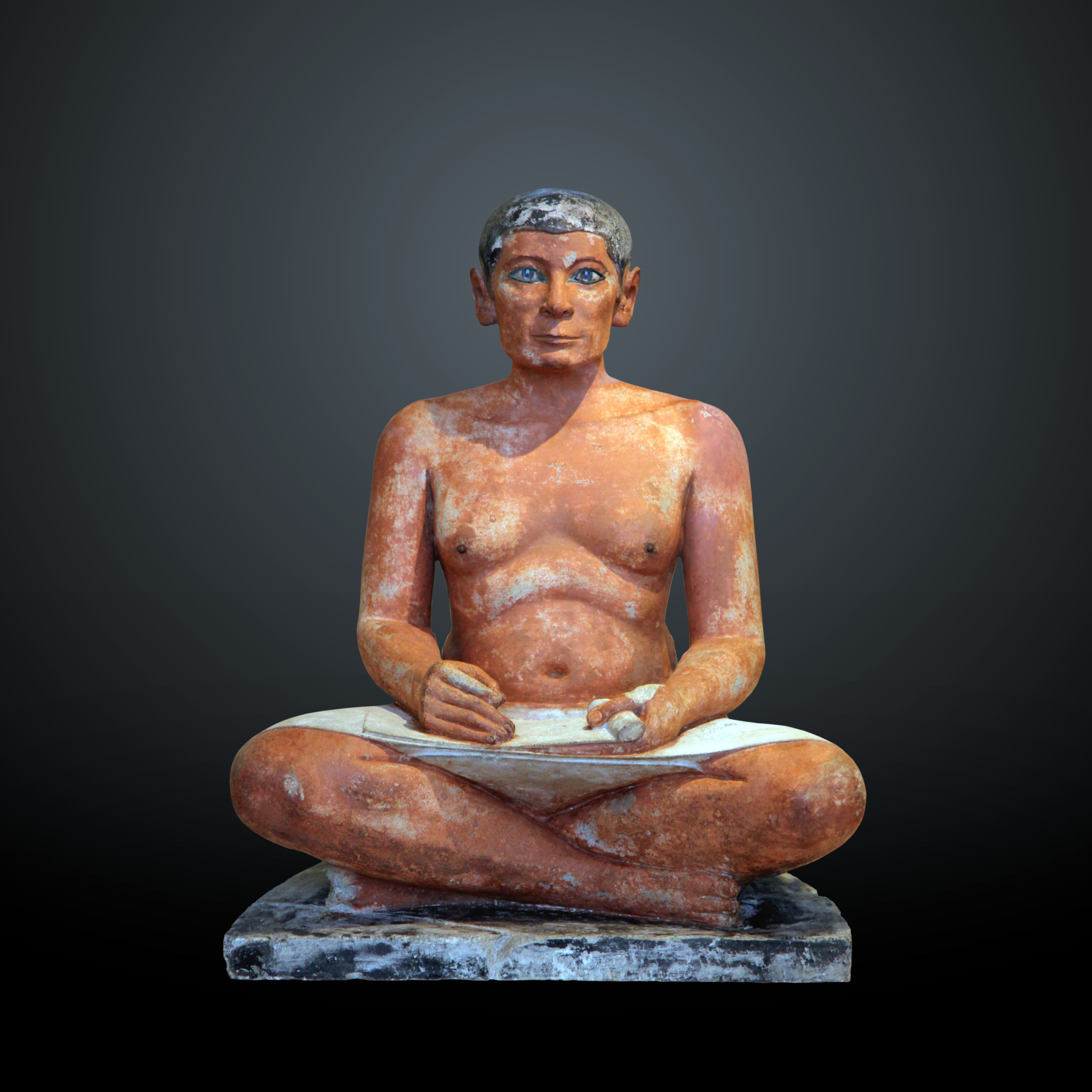
The Seated Scribe; 2613–2494 BC; painted limestone and inlaid quartz; height: 53.7 cm; Louvre

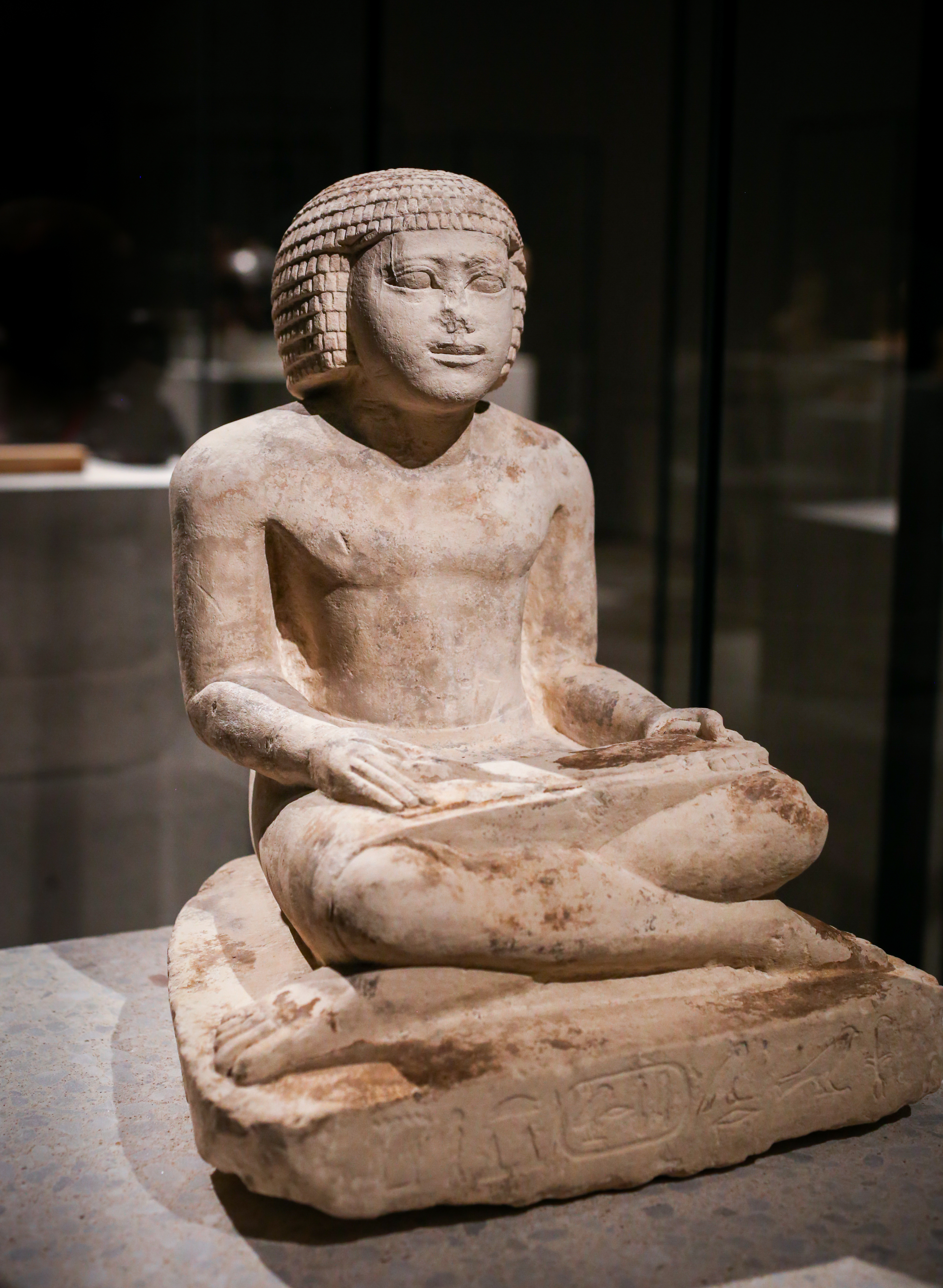
Portrait statue of Henka, administrator of the two pyramids of pharaoh Snofru; 2500–2350 BC; limestone; height: 40 cm; Egyptian Museum of Berlin (Germany)

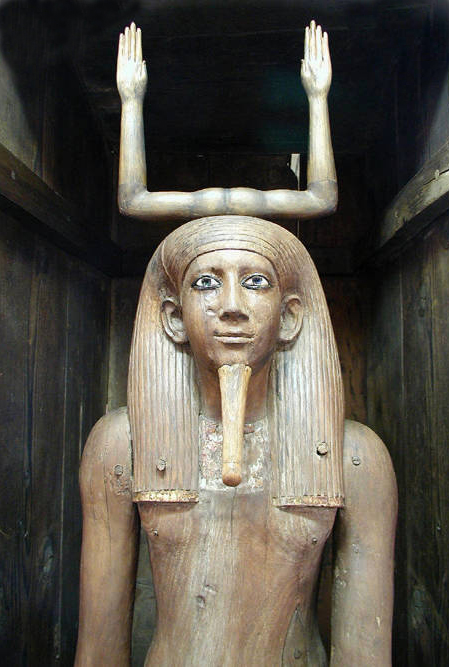
The Ka statue of Awibre Hor, which provided a physical place for the ka to manifest; c. 1700 BC; wood, rock crystal, quartz, plaster, traces of gold; height: 1.7 m; from Dahshur; Egyptian Museum (Cairo)

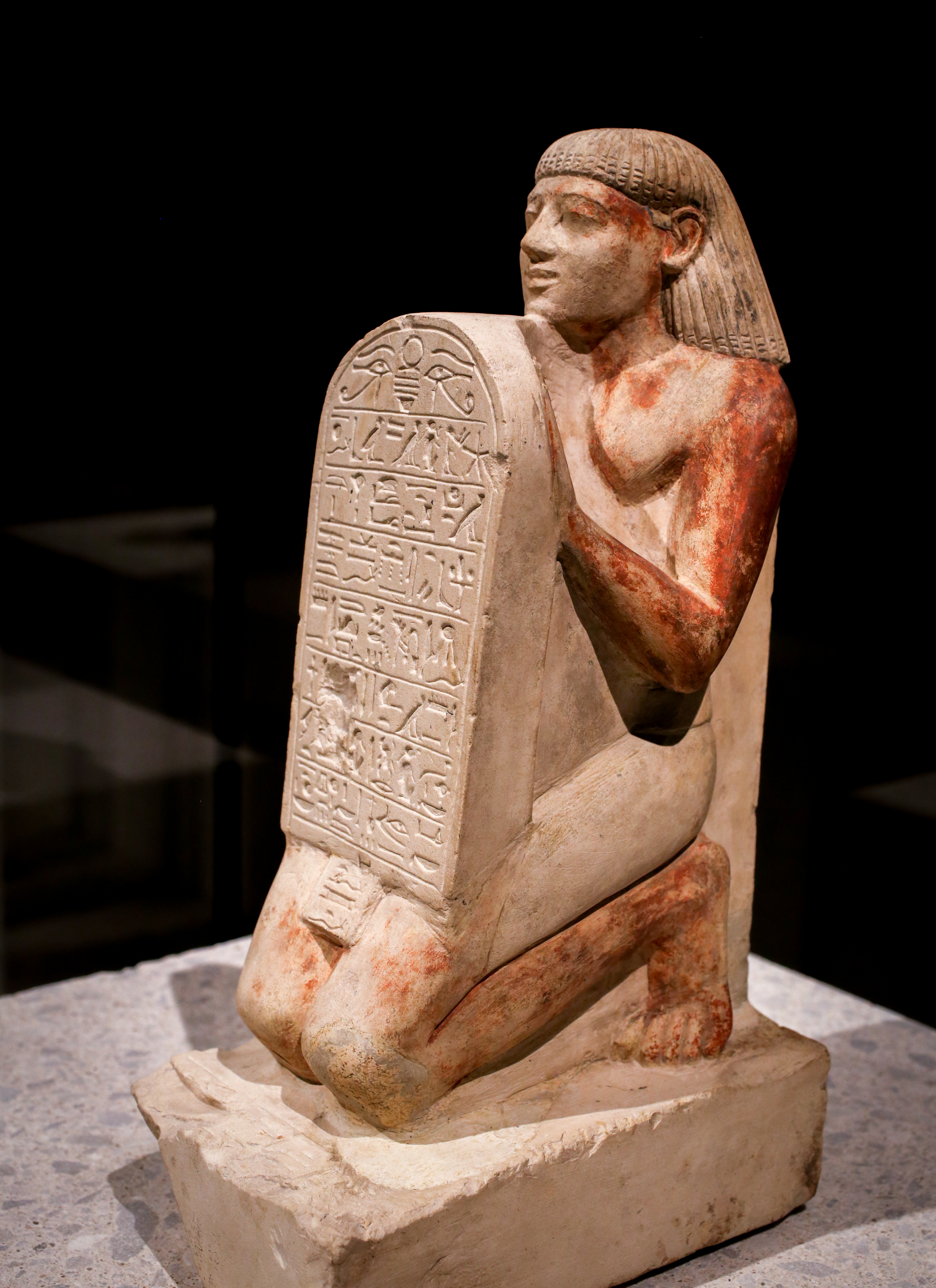
Kneeling portrait statue of Amenemhat holding a stele with an inscription; circa 1500 BC; limestone; Egyptian Museum of Berlin

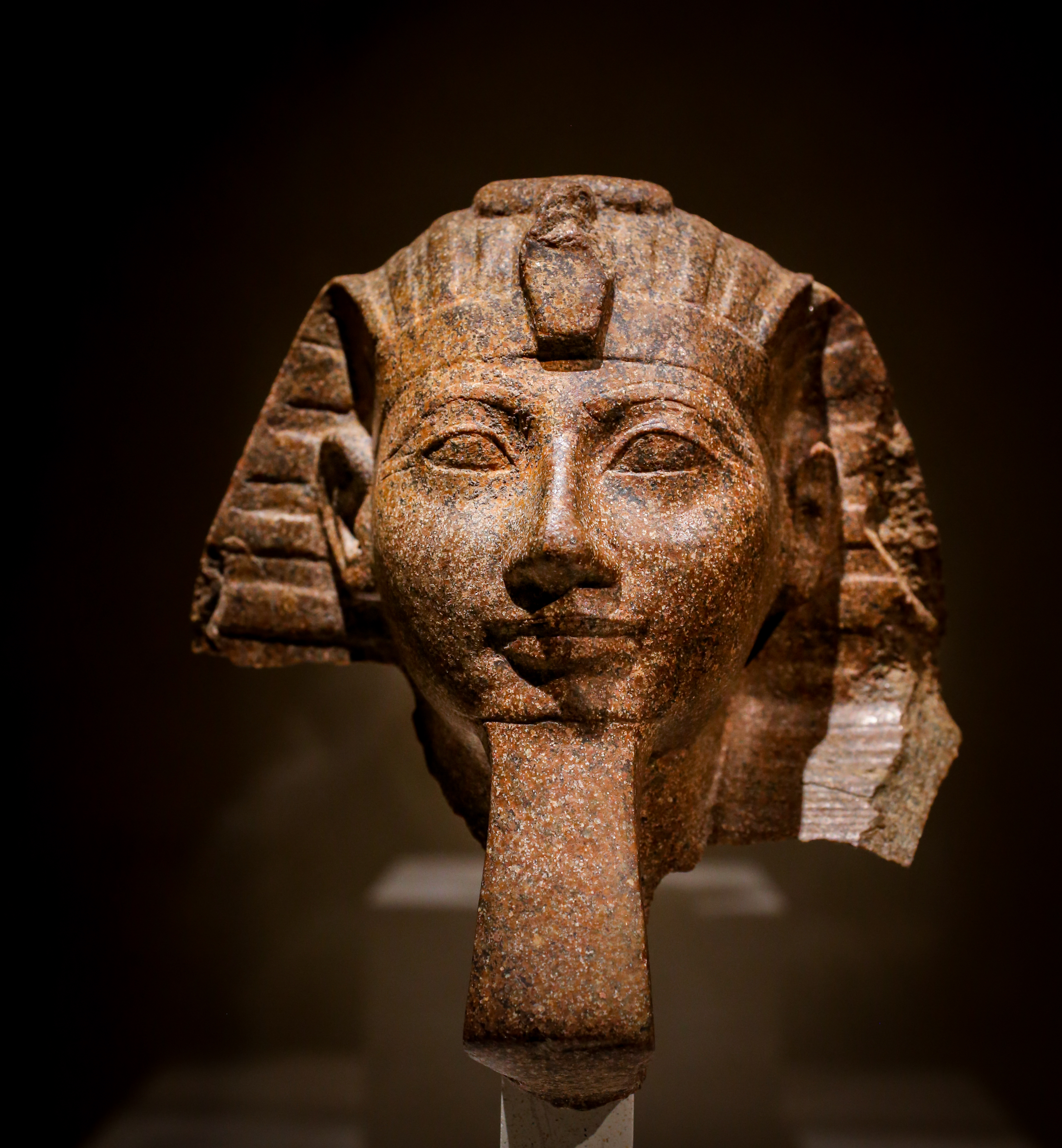
Portrait head of pharaoh Hatshepsut or Thutmose III; 1480–1425 BC; most probably granite; height: 16.5 cm; Egyptian Museum of Berlin

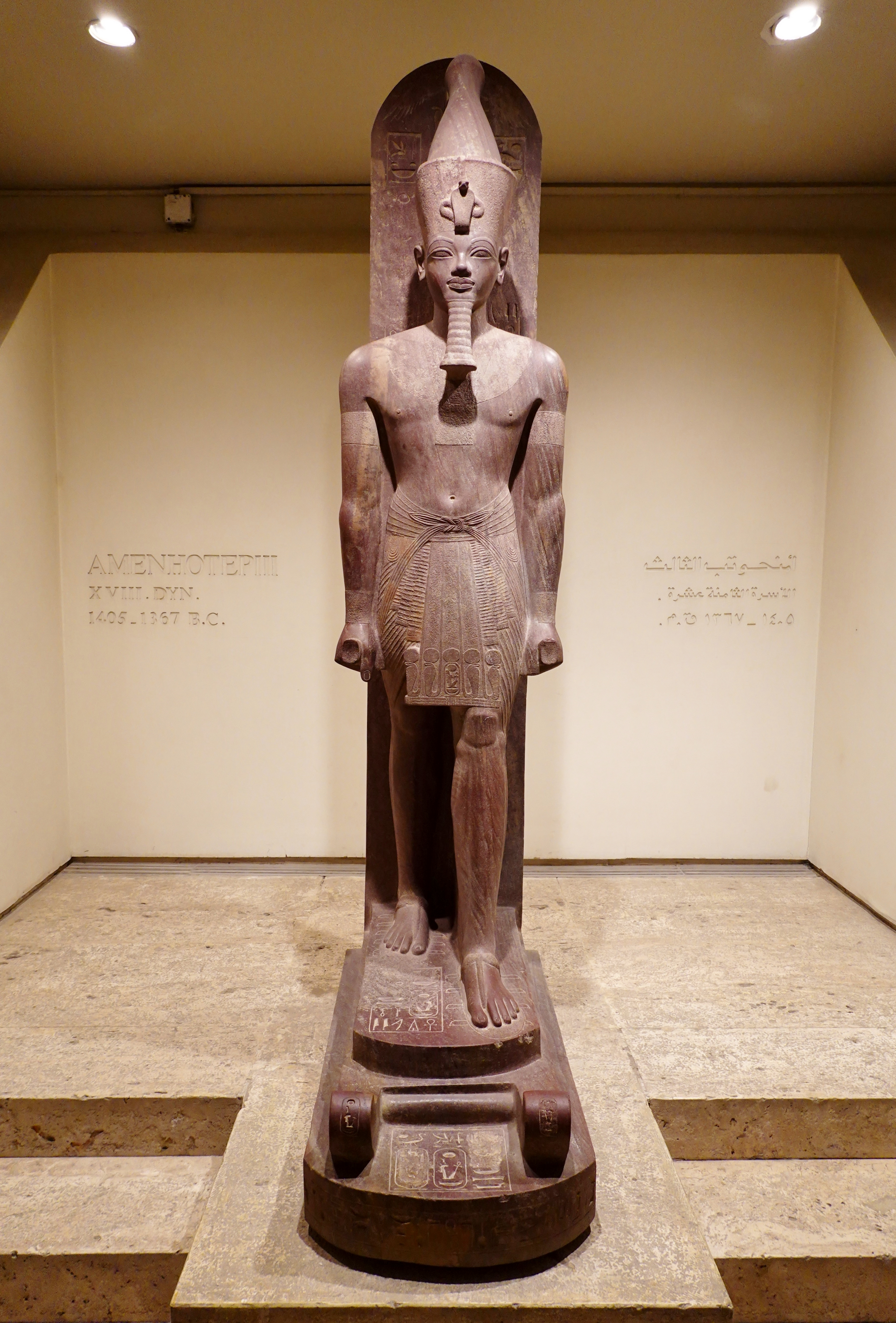
Amenhotep III; 1390–1352 BC; quartzite; height: 2.49 m; Luxor Museum (Luxor, Egypt)

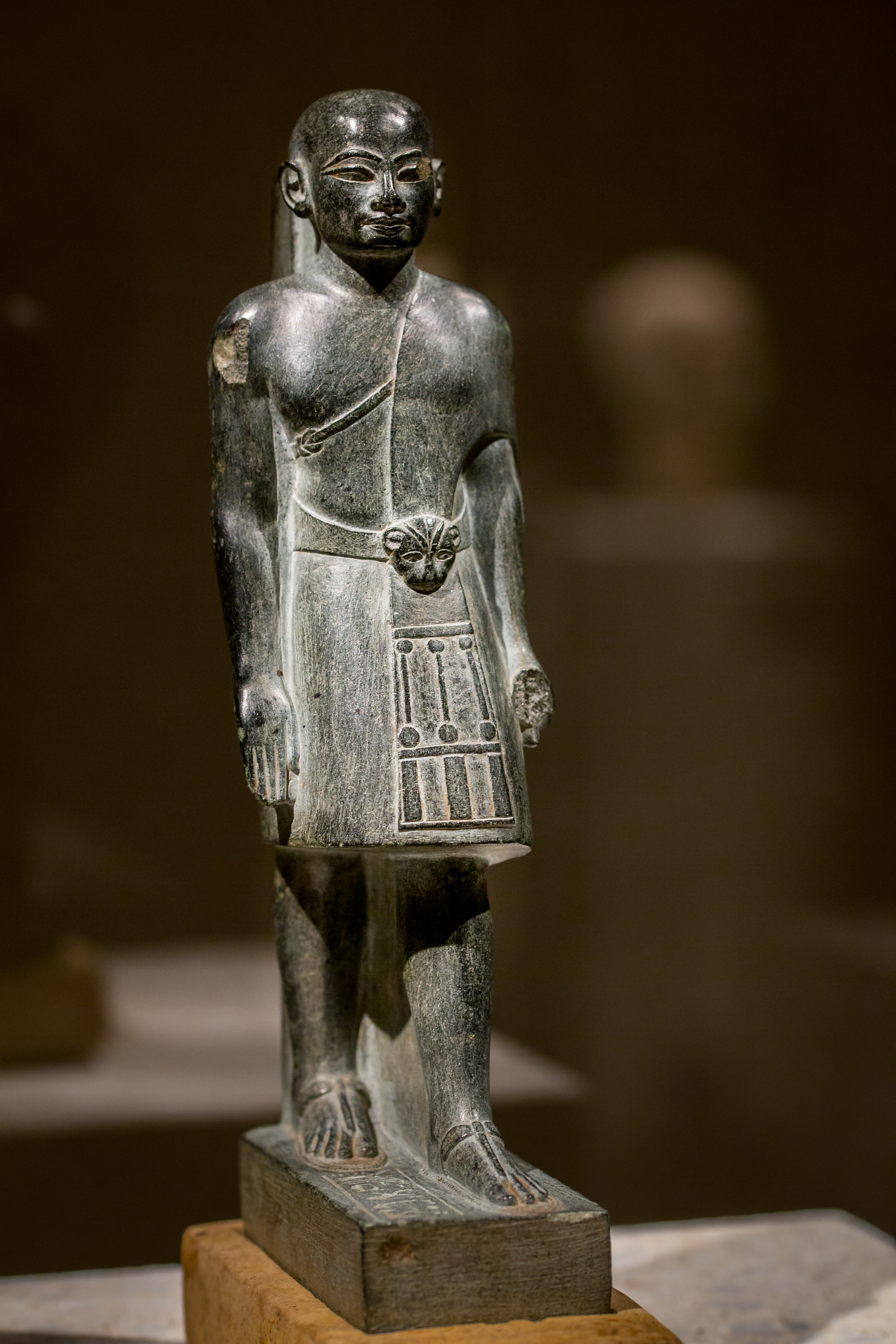
Portrait statuette of Taitai; 1380–1300 BC; greywacke; height: height: 27.5 cm; Egyptian Museum of Berlin

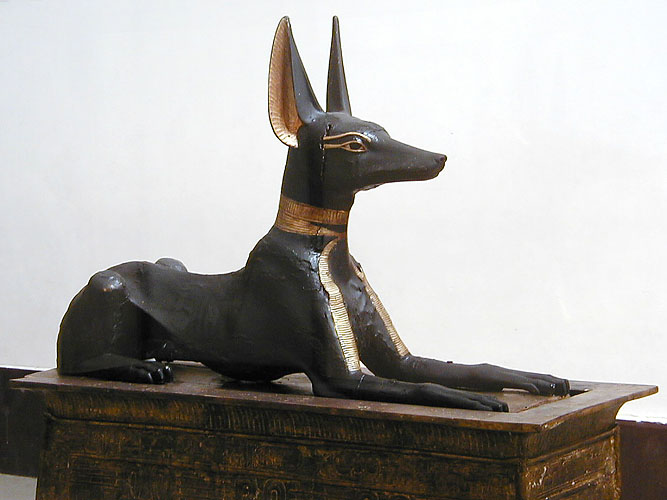
The Anubis Shrine; 1336–1327 BC; painted wood and gold; 1.1 × 2.7 × 0.52 m; from the Valley of the Kings; Egyptian Museum (Cairo)

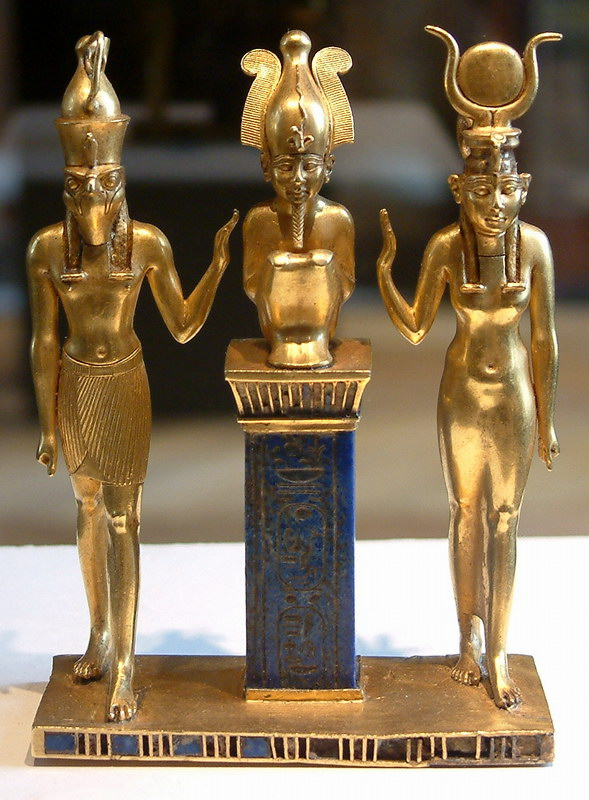
Osiris on a lapis lazuli pillar in the middle, flanked by Horus on the left, and Isis on the right; 875–850 BC; gold and lapis lazuli; 9 cm; Louvre

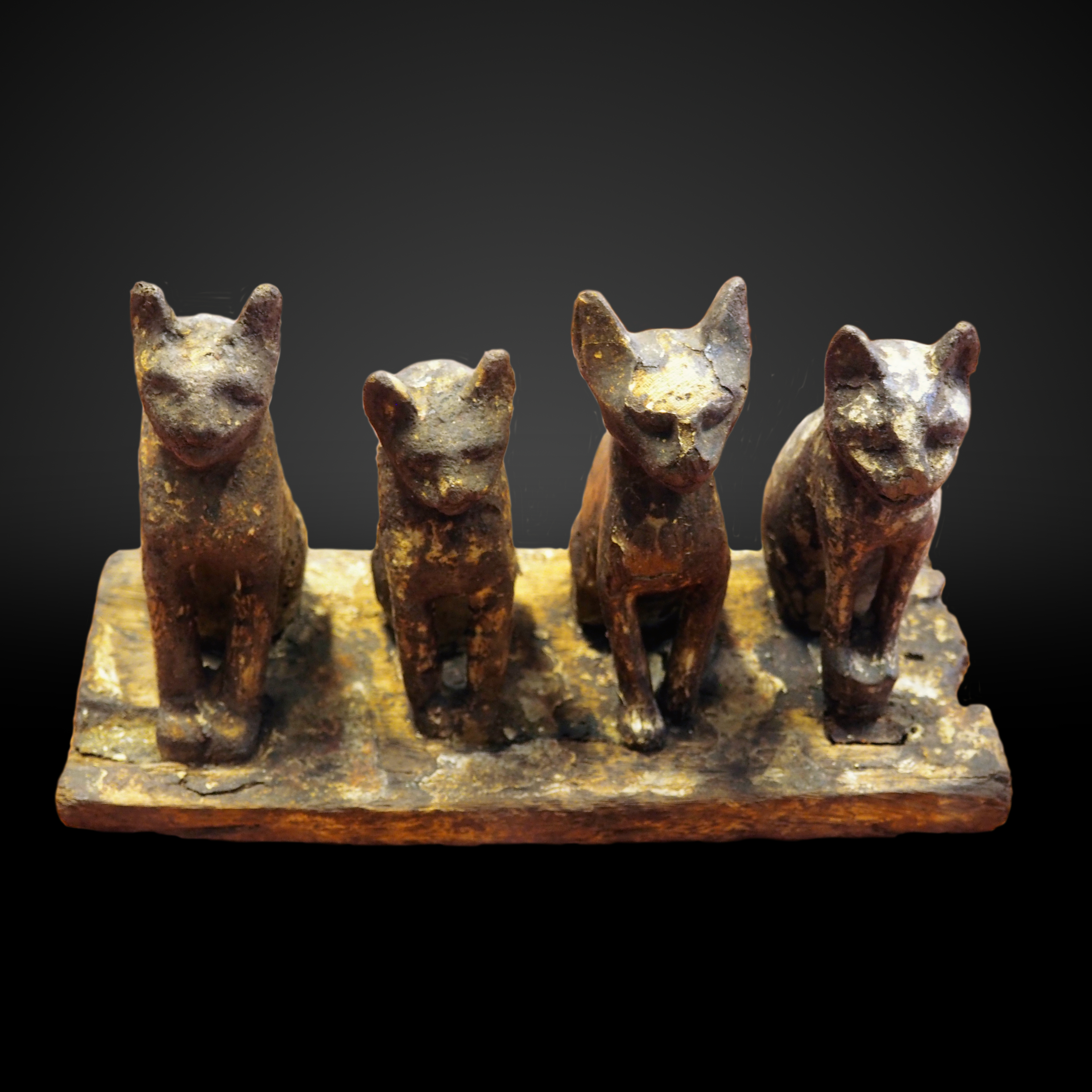
Four cats; 664–332 BC; wood; height: 14 cm, width: 27 cm; Louvre

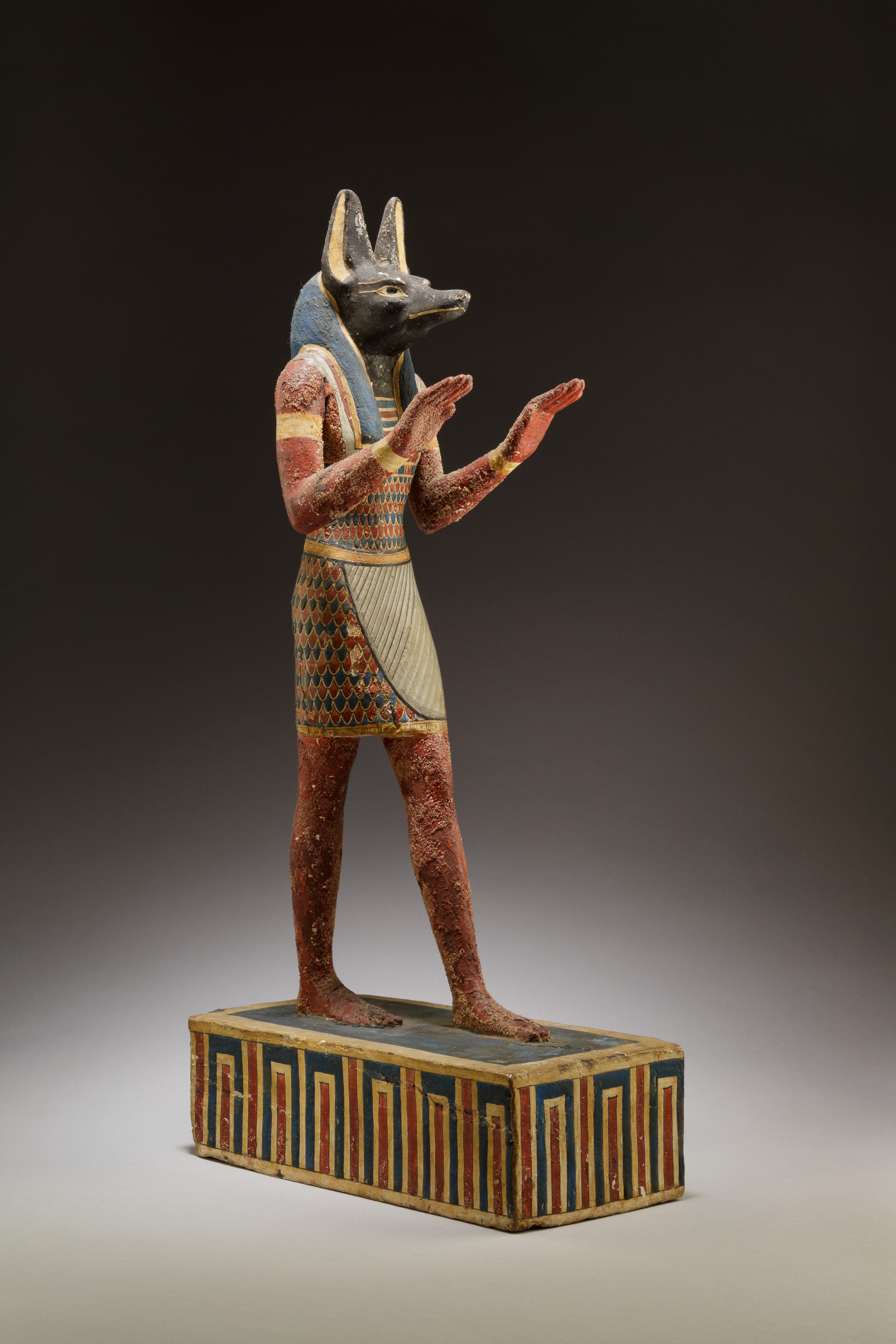
Statuette of Anubis; 332–30 BC; plastered and painted wood; 42.3 cm; Metropolitan Museum of Art (New York City)

=== Stele ===
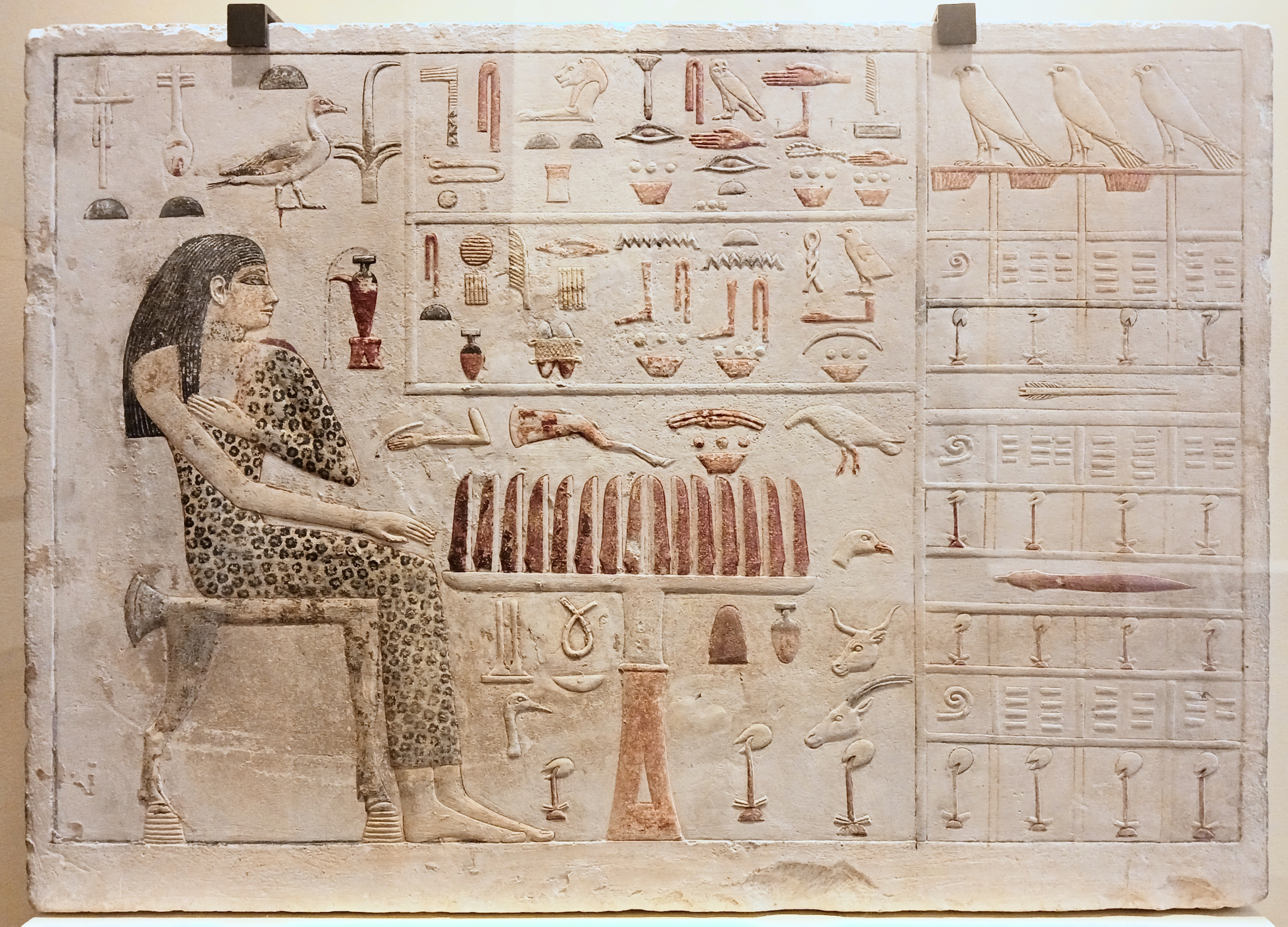
Stele of Princess Nefertiabet eating; 2589–2566 BC; limestone & paint; 37.7 × 52.5 × 8.3 cm; from Giza; Louvre

A stele is an upright tablet of stone or wood, often with a curved top, painted and carved with text and pictures. Numerous examples were produced throughout Egyptian history for a variety of purposes, including funerary, votive and commemorative. Funerary stelae, attested from the early 1st Dynasty, typically bore the name and titles of the deceased. This basic form, which served to identify the tomb owner, evolved into a key component of the funerary equipment with a magical function. Hence, from the 2nd Dynasty onward, the owner was usually shown seated before an offering table piled with food and drink; in the Middle Kingdom, the offering formula was generally inscribed along the top of the stele. Both were designed to ensure a perpetual supply of offerings in the afterlife. Votive stelae, inscribed with prayers to deities, were dedicated by worshipers seeking a favorable outcome to a particular situation. In the Middle Kingdom, many hundreds were set up by pilgrims on the "terrace of the great god" at Abydos, so that they might participate in the annual procession of Osiris. One particular variety of votive stele common in the New Kingdom was the ear stele, inscribed with images of human ears to encourage the deity to listen to the prayer or request.

Commemorative stelae were produced to proclaim notable achievements (for example, the stela of Horwerra, recording a mining expedition to Serabit el-Khadim, and the Restoration Stela of Tutankhamun, celebrating the restoration of the traditional cults at the end of the Amarna period); to celebrate military victories (for instance, the Merneptah Stele); and to establish frontiers (for example the Semna stele of Senusret III and the boundary stelae around Amarna).

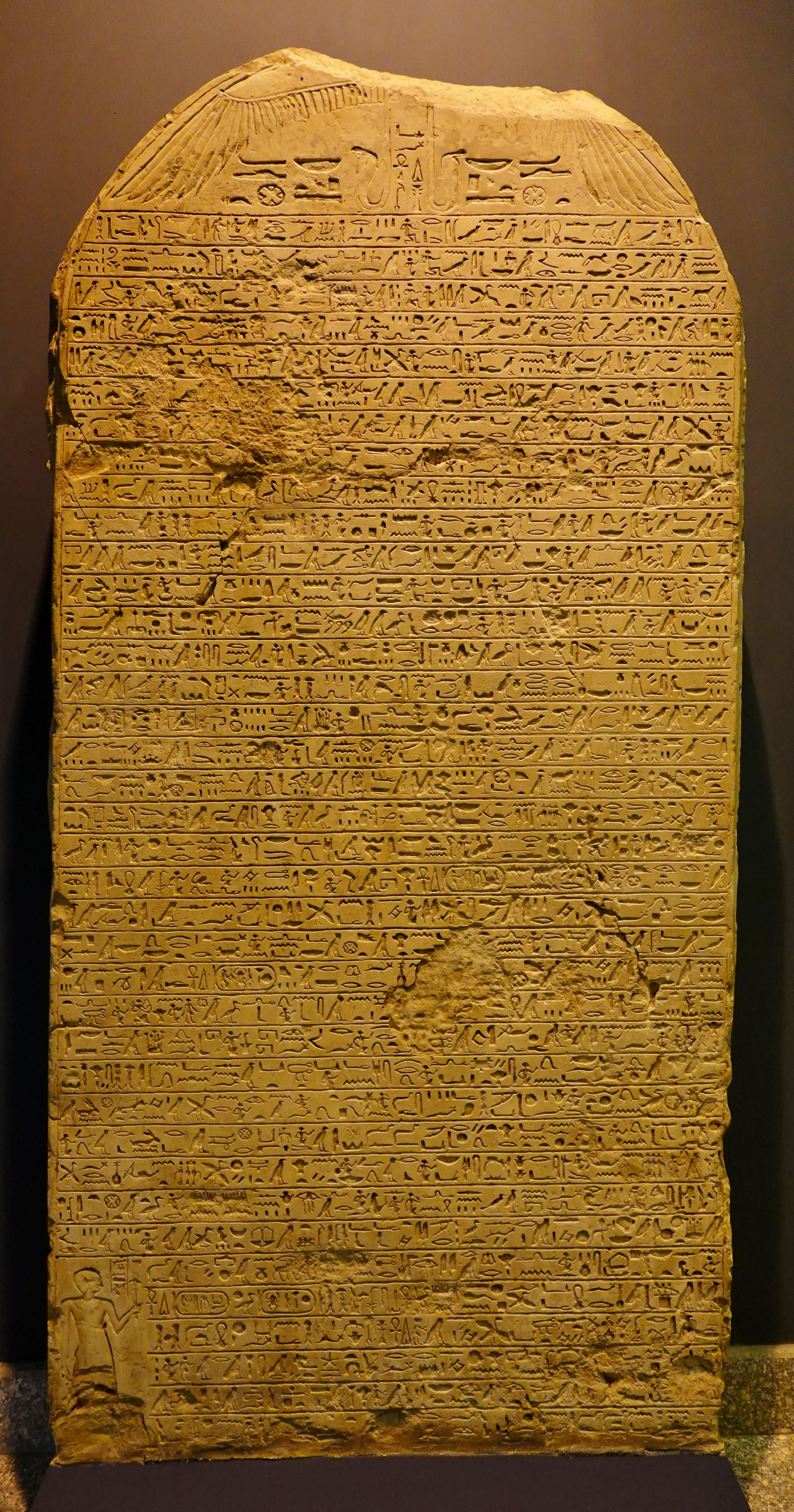
Kamose stela; circa 1550 BC; limestone; height: 2.3 m, width: 1.1 m, depth: 28.5 cm; from the Karnak Temple (Egypt); Luxor Museum (Luxor, Egypt)

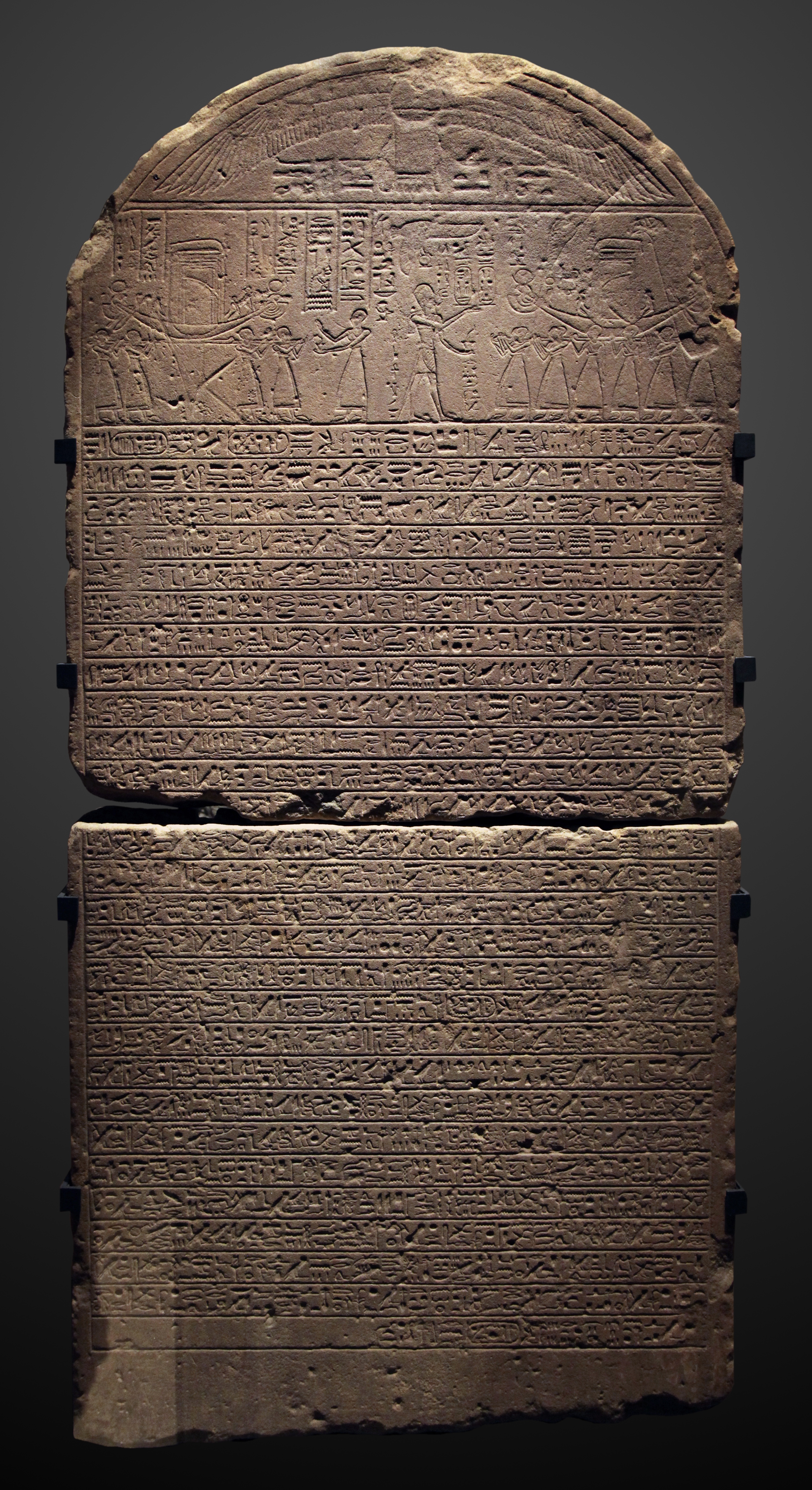
The Bentresh stela; 1069–715 BC; sandstone; 227 x 106 x 14 cm; Louvre

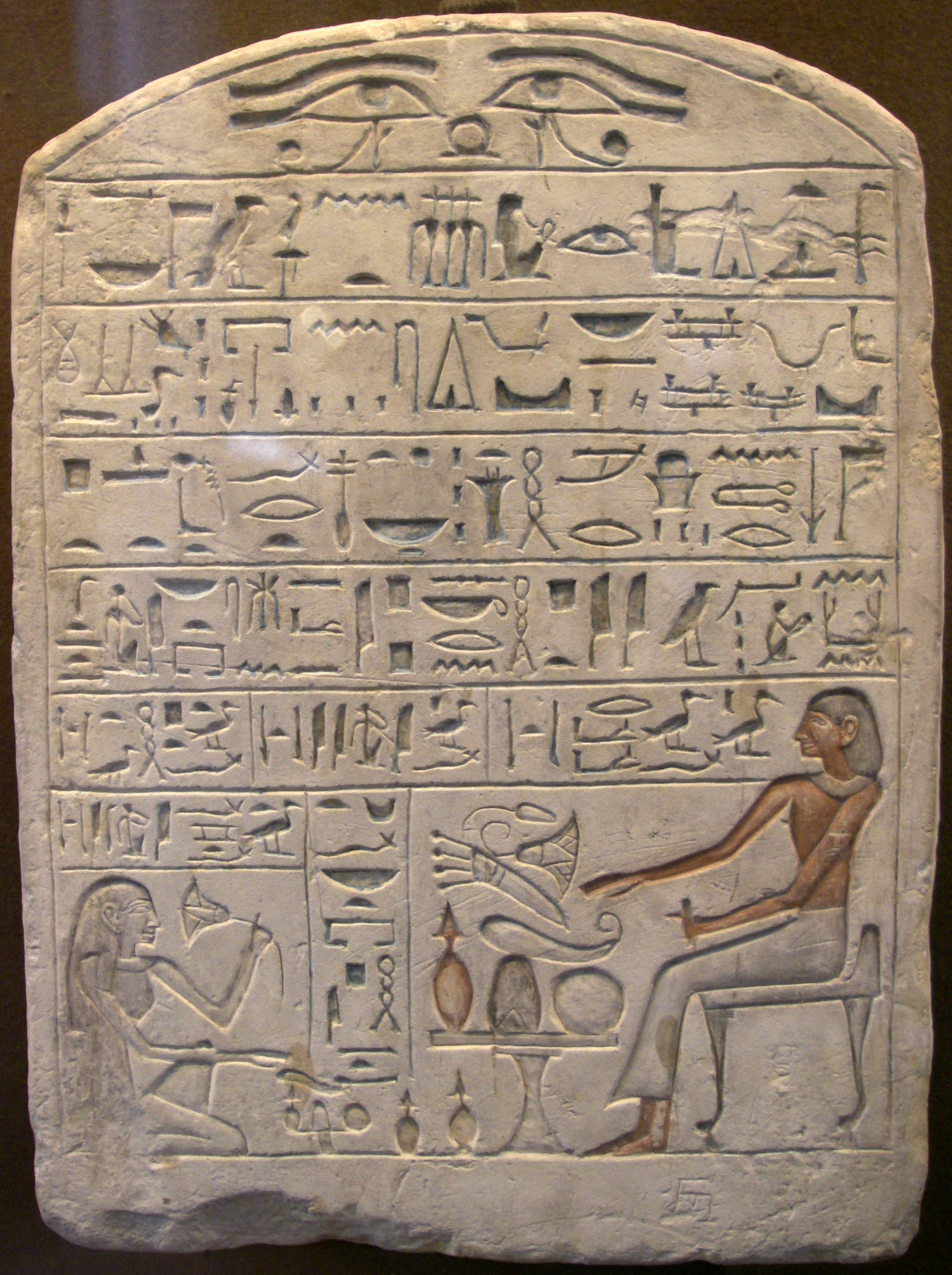
Stela of Pepi, chief of the potters; 8th century BC; painted limestone; Hermitage (Sankt Petersburg, Russia)

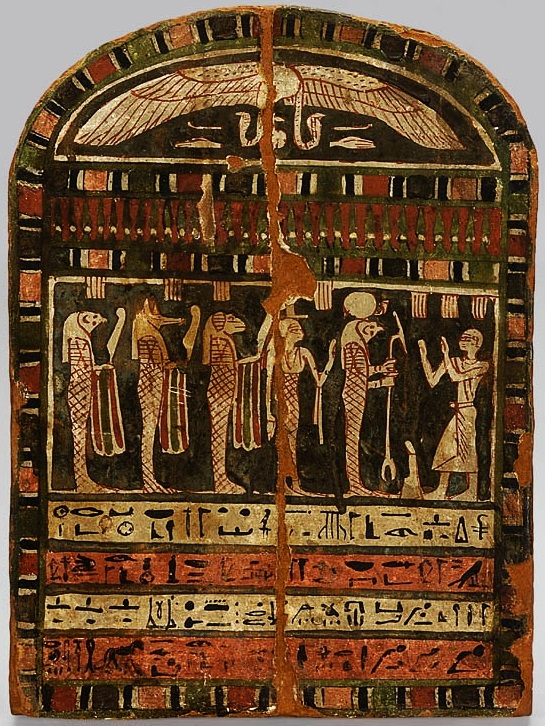
Stela of Nacht-Mahes-eru; 664–610 BC; polychromy on wood; 42 × 31.5 × 3.5 cm; National Museum in Warsaw (Poland)

=== Pyramidia ===
A pyramidion is a capstone at the top of a pyramid. Called benbenet in ancient Egyptian language, it associated the pyramid as a whole with the sacred Benben stone. Pyramidia may have been covered in gold leaf to reflect the rays of the sun; in the Middle Kingdom, they were often inscribed with royal titles and religious symbols.

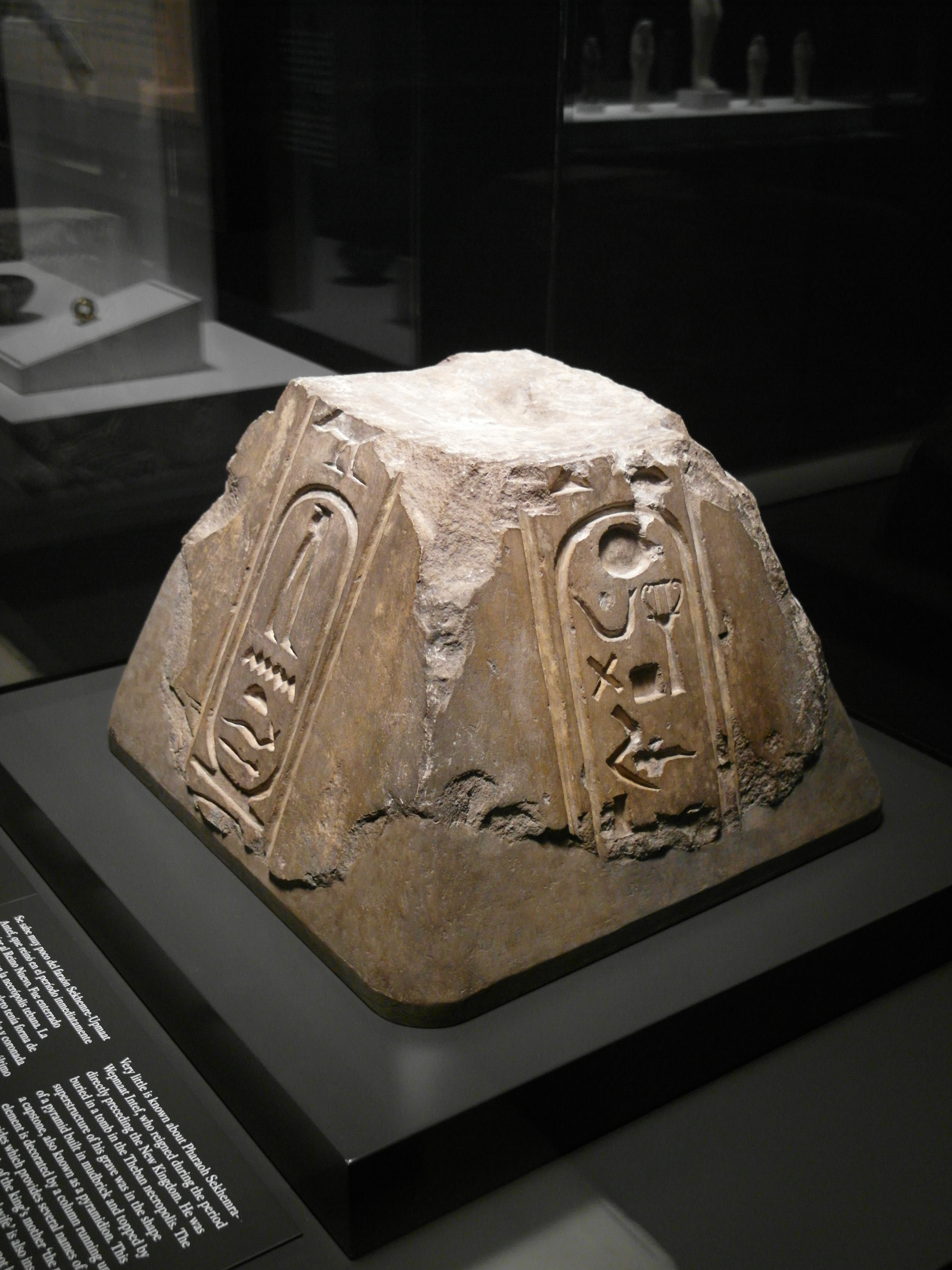
Fragment of a pyramidion; c. 1600 BC; from Thebes; British Museum (London)

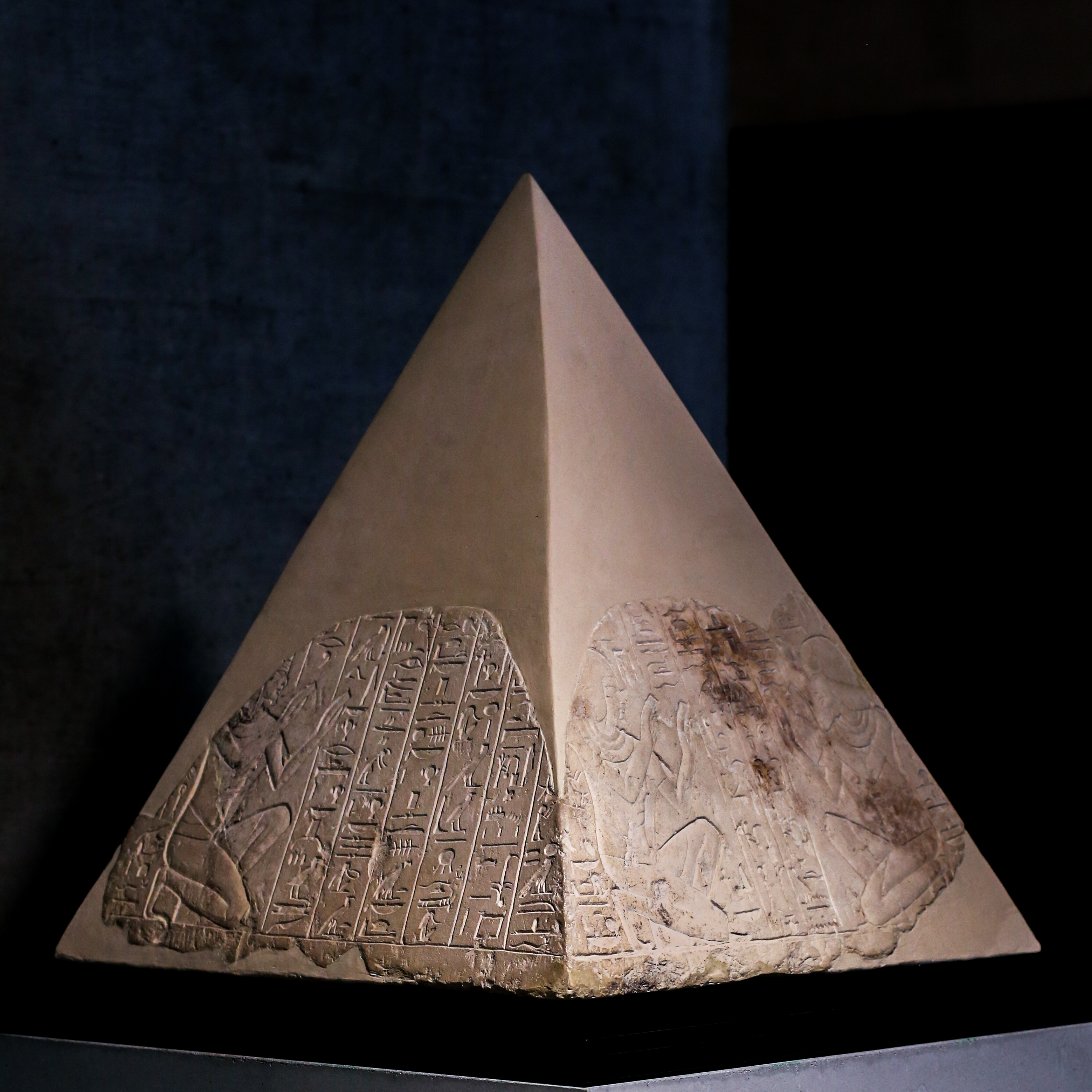
Pyramidion from the pyramid of Nebamun; circa 1380 BC; painted limestone; height: 23 cm; Staatliche Sammlung für Ägyptische Kunst (Munich, Germany)

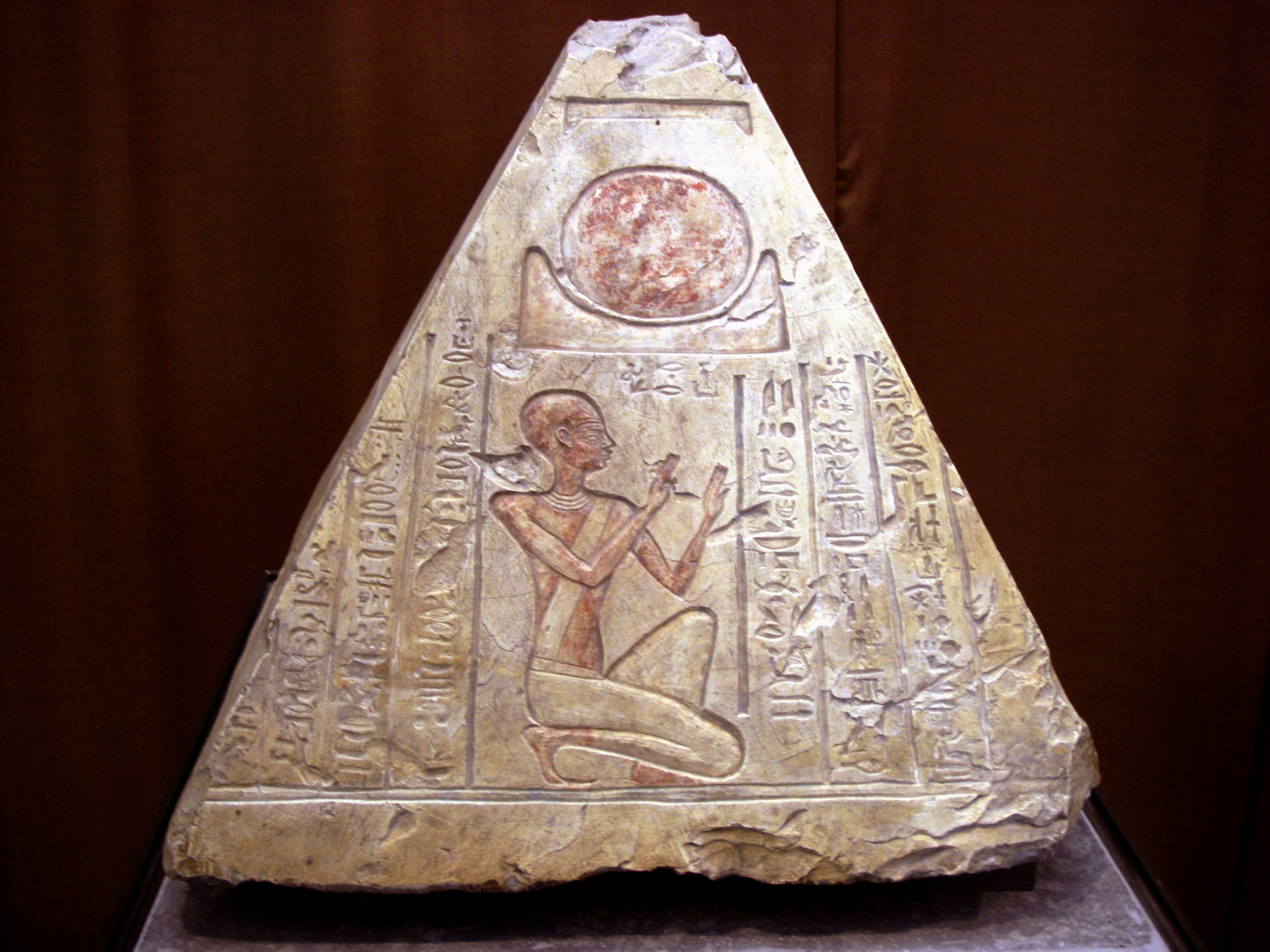
Pyramidion from the tomb of the priest Rer in Abydos, Egypt. Hermitage Museum

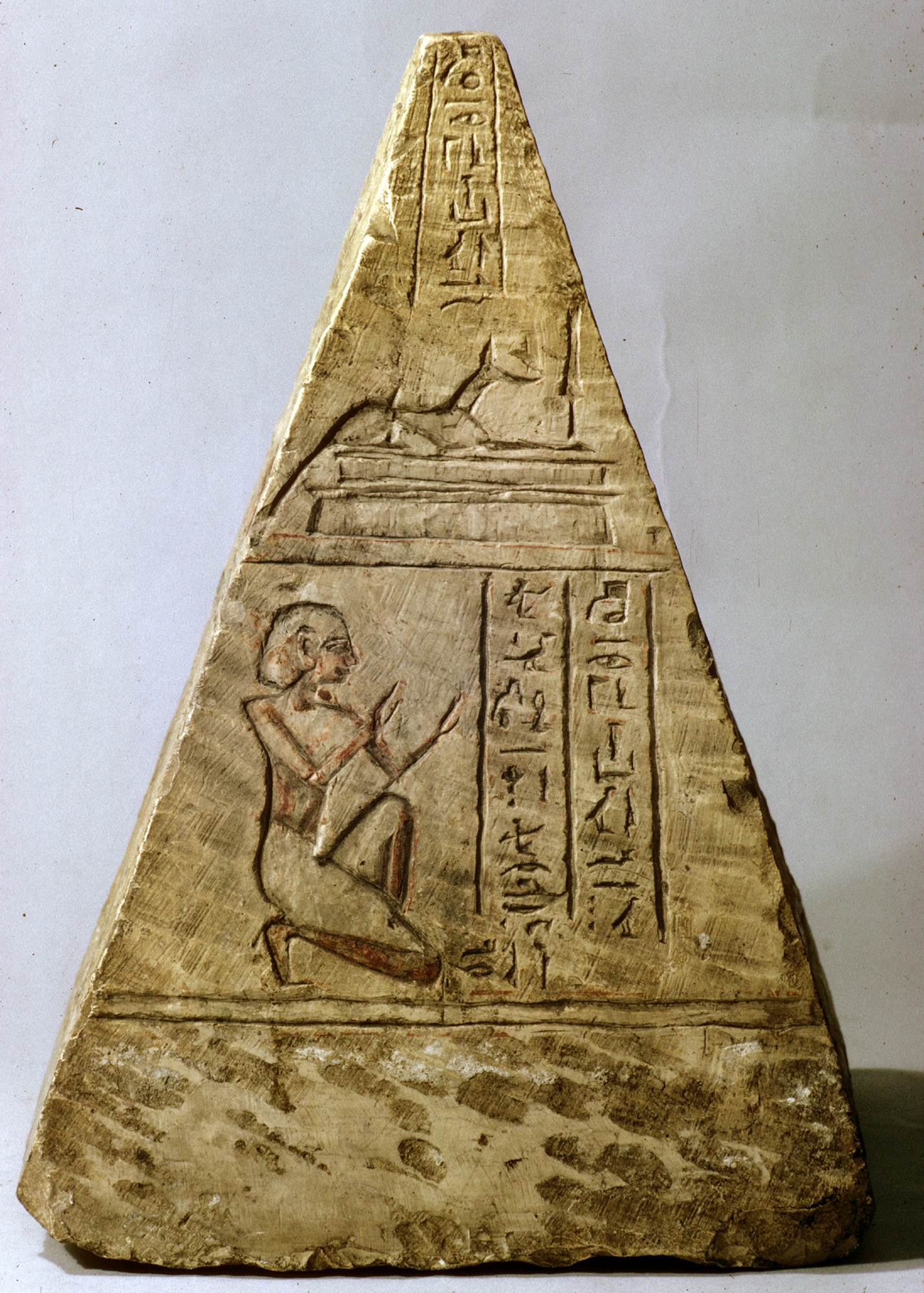
Pyramidion of Iufaa; 664–525 BC; painted limestone; height: 36 cm; Metropolitan Museum of Art (New York City)

== Painting ==
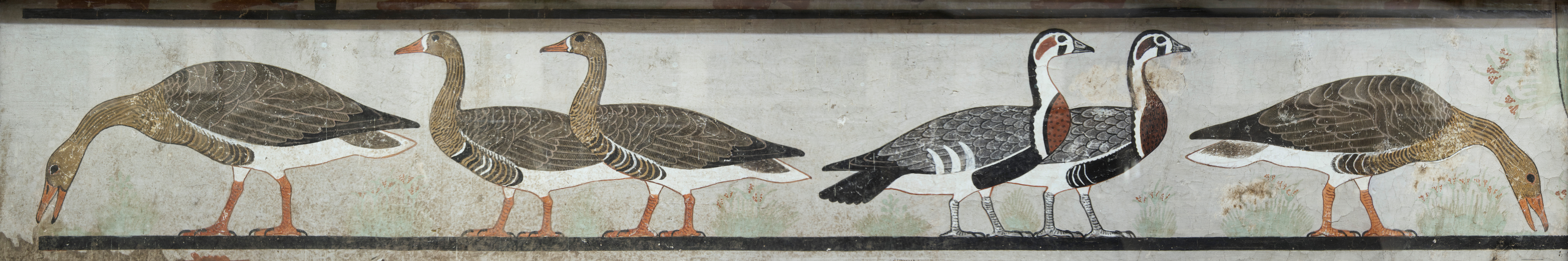
The Meidum geese; 2575–2551 BC; painted gypsum; 27 x 172 cm; Egyptian Museum (Cairo)

Not all Egyptian reliefs were painted, and less-prestigious works in tombs, temples and palaces were merely painted on a flat surface. Stone surfaces were prepared by whitewash, or if rough, a layer of coarse mud plaster, with a smoother gesso layer above; some finer limestones could take paint directly. Pigments were mostly mineral, chosen to withstand strong sunlight without fading. The binding medium used in painting remains unclear: egg tempera and various gums and resins have been suggested. It is clear that true fresco, painted into a thin layer of wet plaster, was not used. Instead, the paint was applied to dried plaster, in what is called fresco a secco in Italian. After painting, a varnish or resin was usually applied as a protective coating, and many paintings with some exposure to the elements have survived remarkably well, although those on fully exposed walls rarely have. Small objects including wooden statuettes were often painted using similar techniques.

Many ancient Egyptian paintings have survived in tombs, and sometimes temples, due to Egypt's extremely dry climate. The paintings were often made with the intent of making a pleasant afterlife for the deceased. The themes included journeys through the afterworld or protective deities introducing the deceased to the gods of the underworld (such as Osiris). Some tomb paintings show activities that the deceased were involved in when they were alive and wished to carry on doing for eternity.

From the New Kingdom period and afterwards, the Book of the Dead was buried with the entombed person. It was considered important for an introduction to the afterlife.

Egyptian paintings are painted in such a way to show a side view and a front view of the animal or person at the same time. For example, the painting to the right shows the head from a profile view and the body from a frontal view. Their main colors were red, blue, green, gold, black and yellow.

Paintings showing scenes of hunting and fishing can have lively close-up landscape backgrounds of reeds and water, but in general Egyptian painting did not develop a sense of depth, and neither landscapes nor a sense of visual perspective are found, the figures rather varying in size with their importance rather than their location.

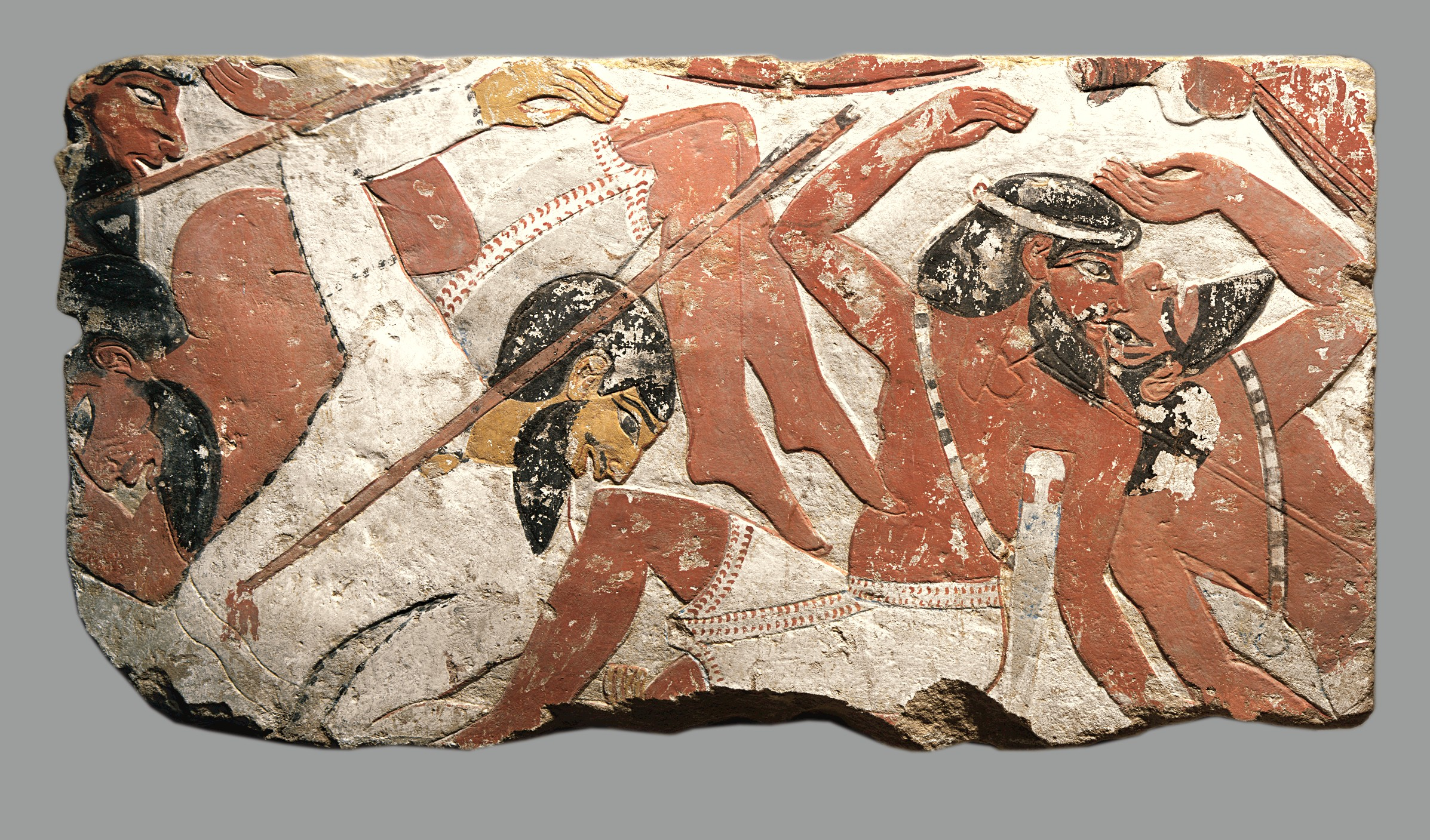
Block from a relief depicting a battle; 1427–1400 BC; painted sandstone; height: 61.5 cm (24.2 in); Metropolitan Museum of Art (US)

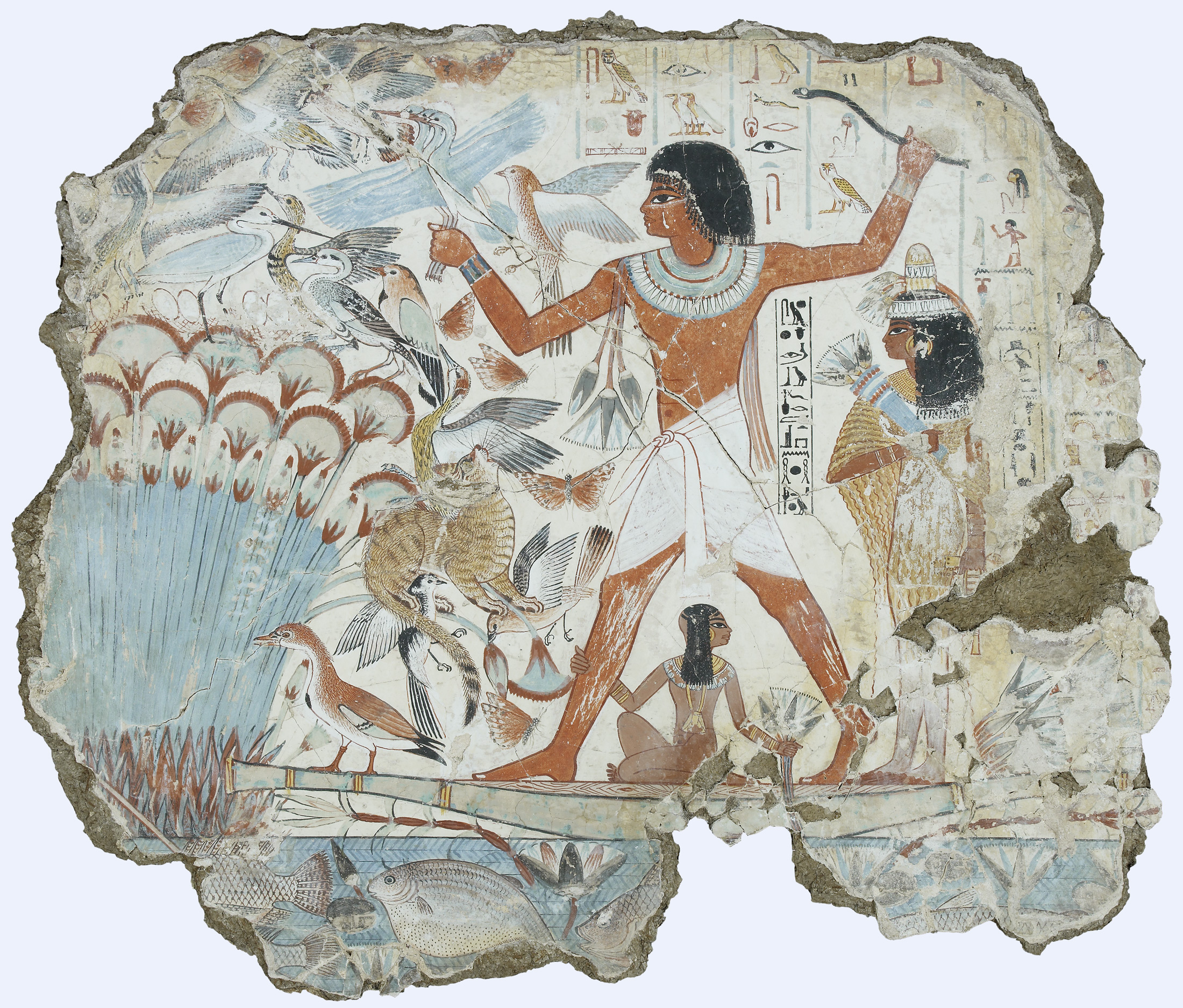
Fresco which depicts Nebamun hunting birds; 1350 BC; paint on plaster; 98 × 83 cm (2 ft 9 in) × 2 ft 8.7 in); British Museum (London)

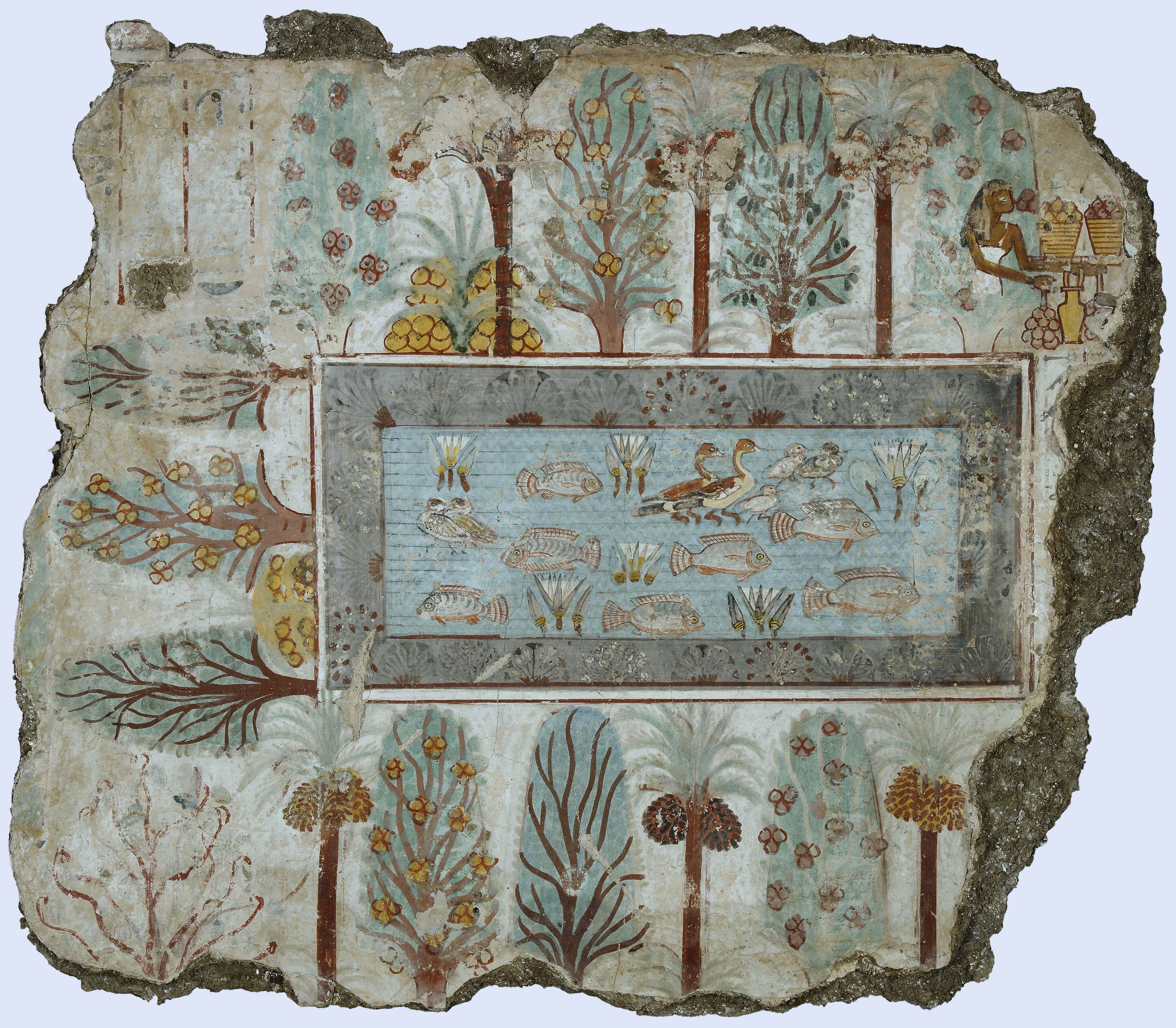
Fresco which depicts the pool in Nebamun's estate garden; c. 1350 BC; painted plaster; height: 64 cm; British Museum

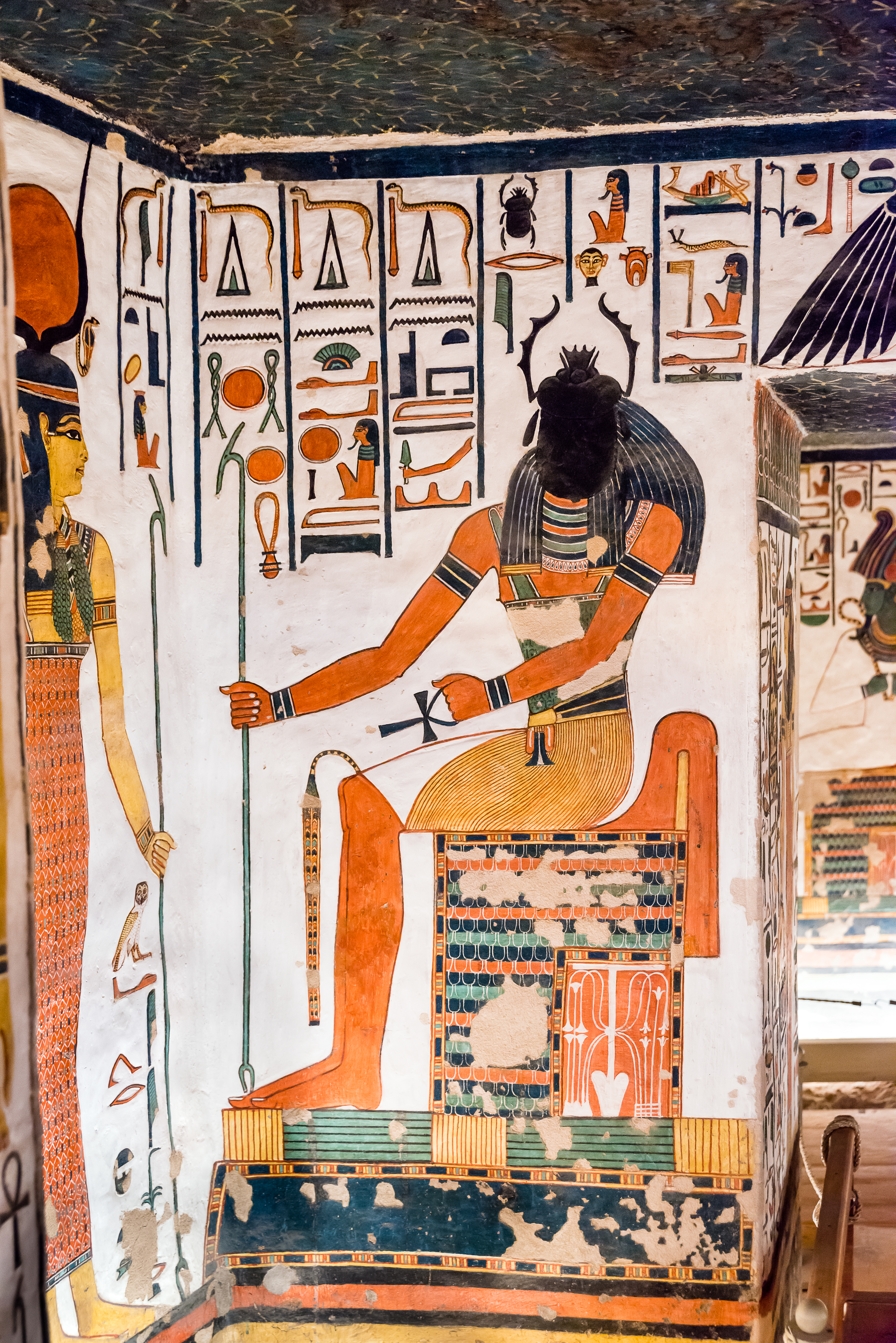
Frescos in the Tomb of Nefertari, in which appear Khepri sitting on a very colourful square-shaped throne

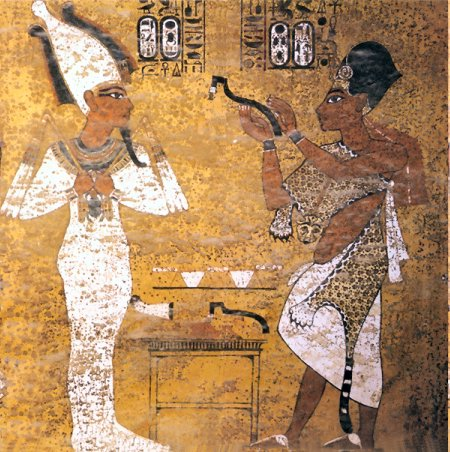
Wall painting from Tutankhamun's tomb depicting Ay performing the Opening of the Mouth ceremony

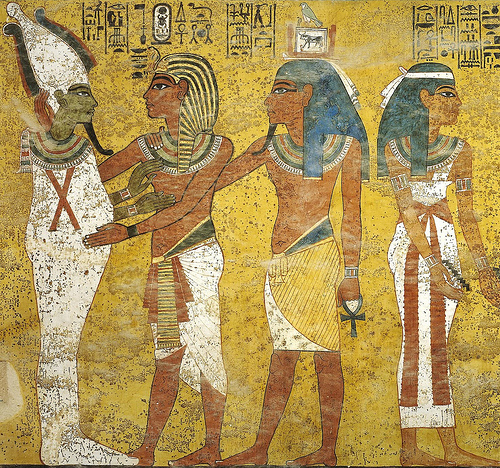
Scene from the tomb of Tutankhamun in which appears Osiris

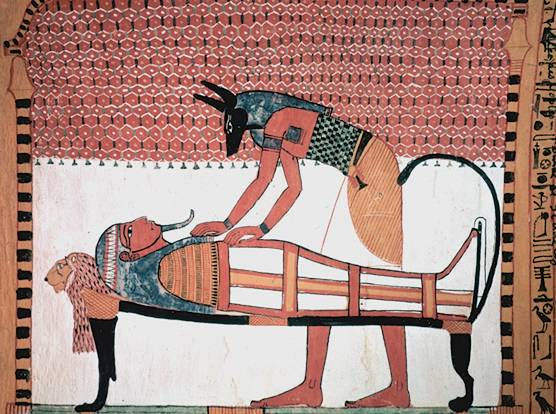
Picture of the wall painting from the tomb of Sennedjem in which Anubis attends the mummy of the deceased

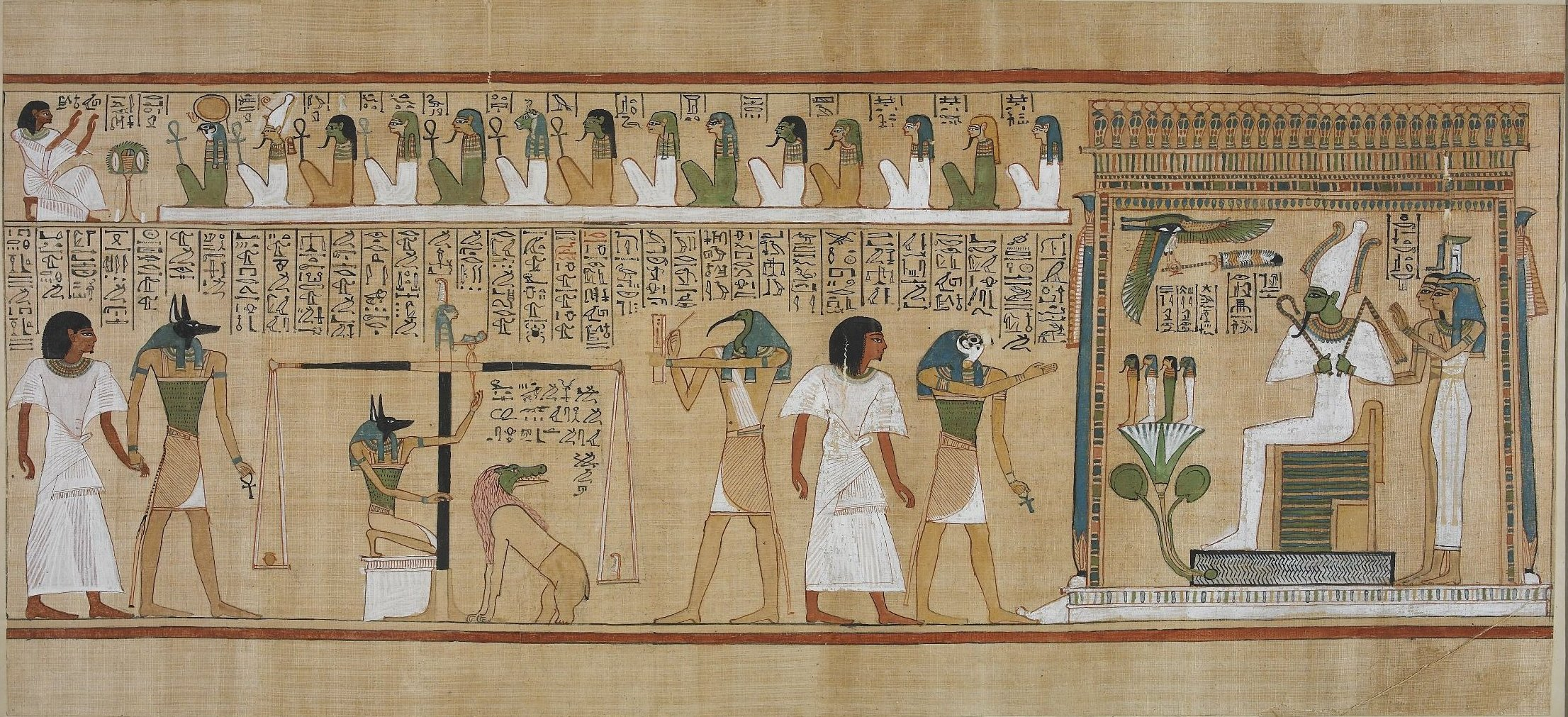
The Book of the Dead of Hunefer; c. 1275 BC; ink and pigments on papyrus; 45 × 90.5 cm; British Museum (London)

== Architecture ==
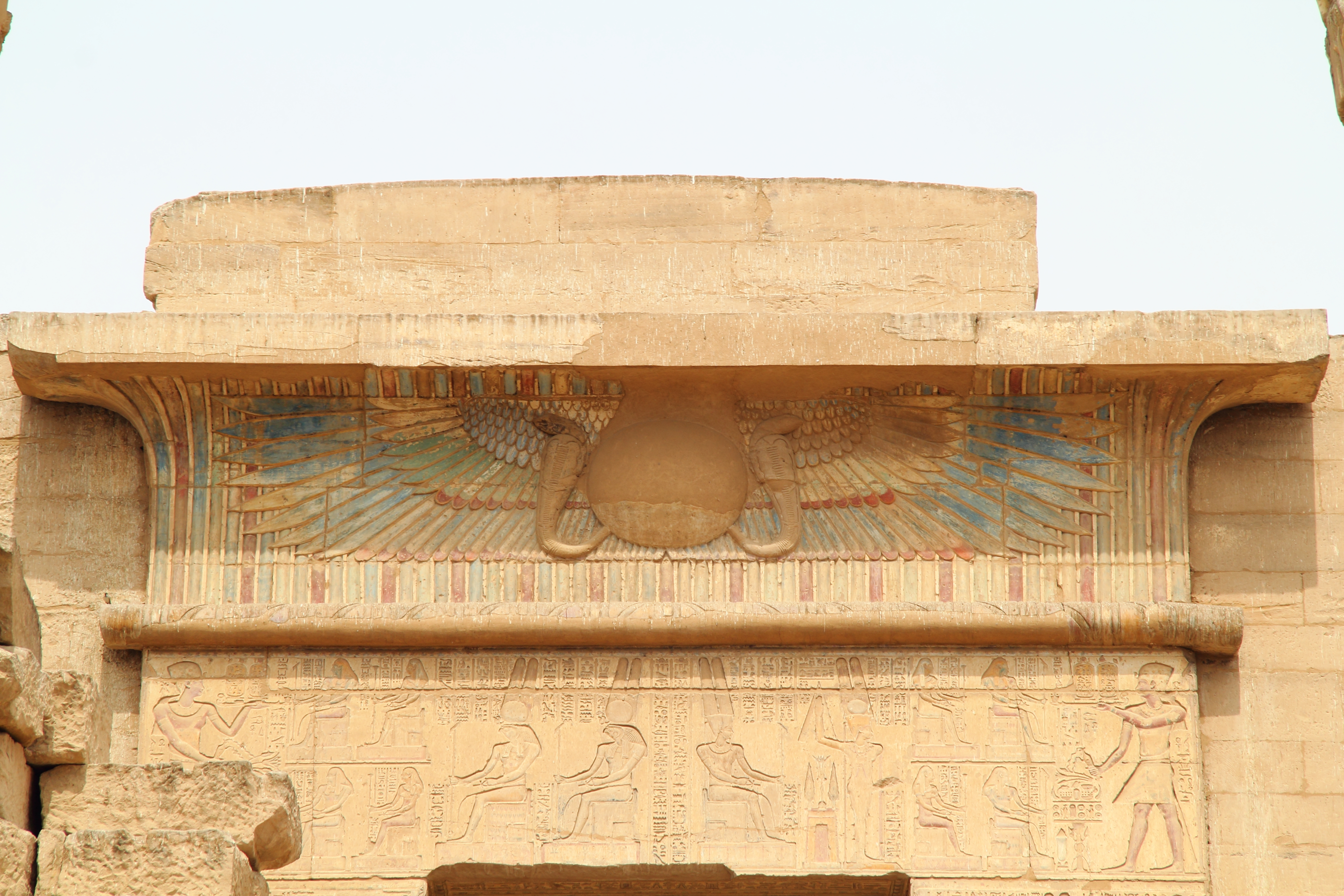
Winged sun on a cavetto from the Medinet Habu temple complex. The winged sun represents a form of the falcon god Horus, son of Isis, triumphant over his enemies. The image was also a common protective device over temple entrances. Winged disks are a popular motif in Egyptian Revival architecture and art

Ancient Egyptian architects used sun-dried and kiln-baked bricks, fine sandstone, limestone and granite. Architects carefully planned all their work. The stones had to fit precisely together, since no mud or mortar was used. When creating the pyramids it is unknown how the workers or stones reached the top of them as no records were kept of their construction. When the top of the structure was completed, the artists decorated from the top down, removing ramp sand as they went down. Exterior walls of structures like the pyramids contained only a few small openings. Hieroglyphic and pictorial carvings in brilliant colors were abundantly used to decorate Egyptian structures, including many motifs, like the scarab, sacred beetle, the solar disk, and the vulture. They described the changes the Pharaoh would go through to become a god.

As early as 2600 BC the architect Imhotep made use of stone columns whose surface was carved to reflect the organic form of bundled reeds, like papyrus, lotus and palm; in later Egyptian architecture faceted cylinders were also common. Their form is thought to derive from archaic reed-built shrines. Carved from stone, the columns were highly decorated with carved and painted hieroglyphs, texts, ritual imagery and natural motifs. One of the most important types are the papyriform columns. The origin of these columns goes back to the 5th Dynasty. They are composed of lotus (papyrus) stems which are drawn together into a bundle decorated with bands: the capital, instead of opening out into the shape of a bellflower, swells out and then narrows again like a flower in bud. The base, which tapers to take the shape of a half-sphere like the stem of the lotus, has a continuously recurring decoration of stipules. At the Luxor Temple, the columns are reminiscent of papyrus bundles, perhaps symbolic of the marsh from which the ancient Egyptians believed the creation of the world to have unfolded.

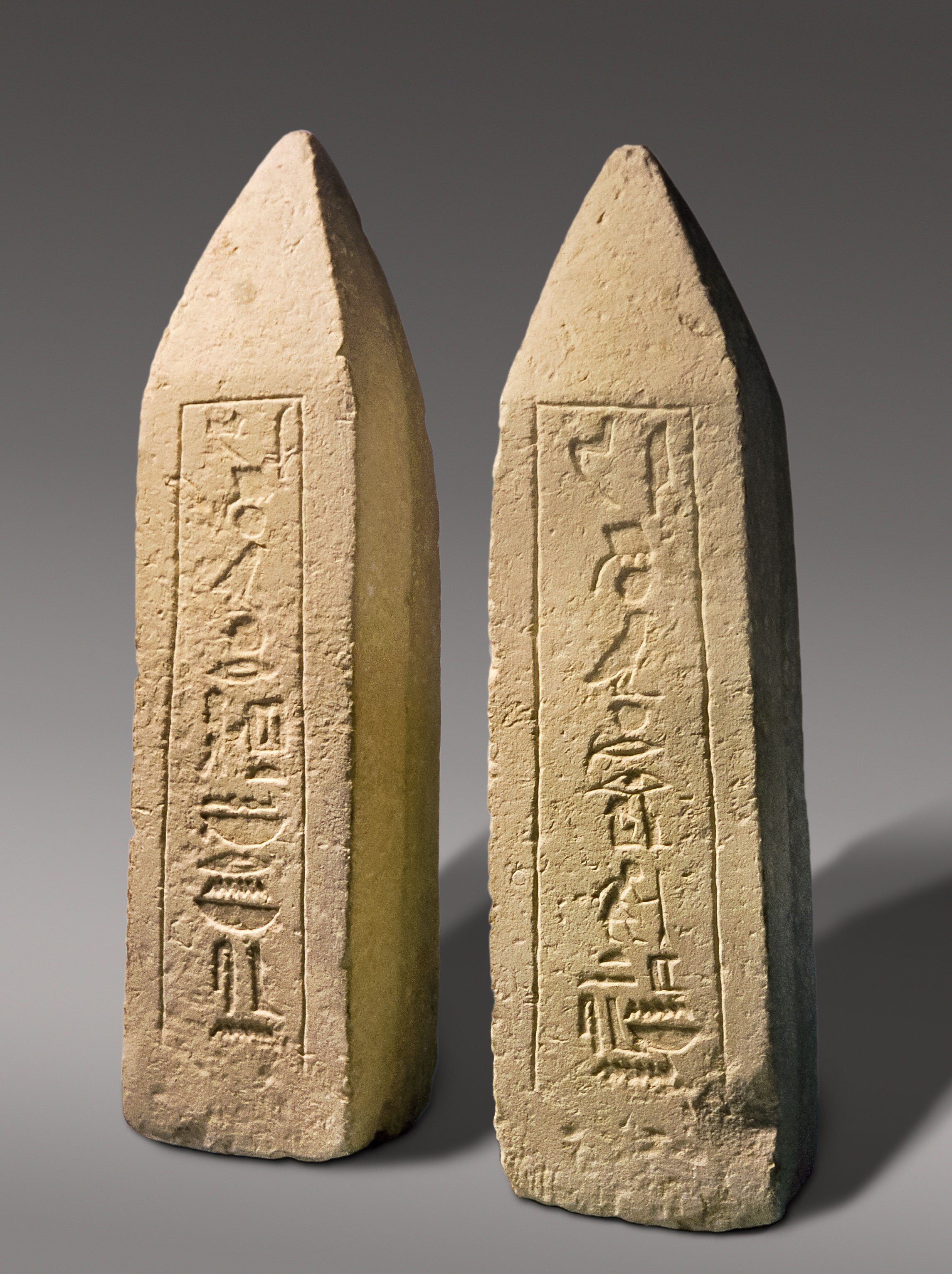
Pair of obelisks of Nebsen; 2323–2100 BC; limestone; (the one from left) height: 52.7 cm, (the one from right) height: 51.1 cm; Metropolitan Museum of Art (New York City)

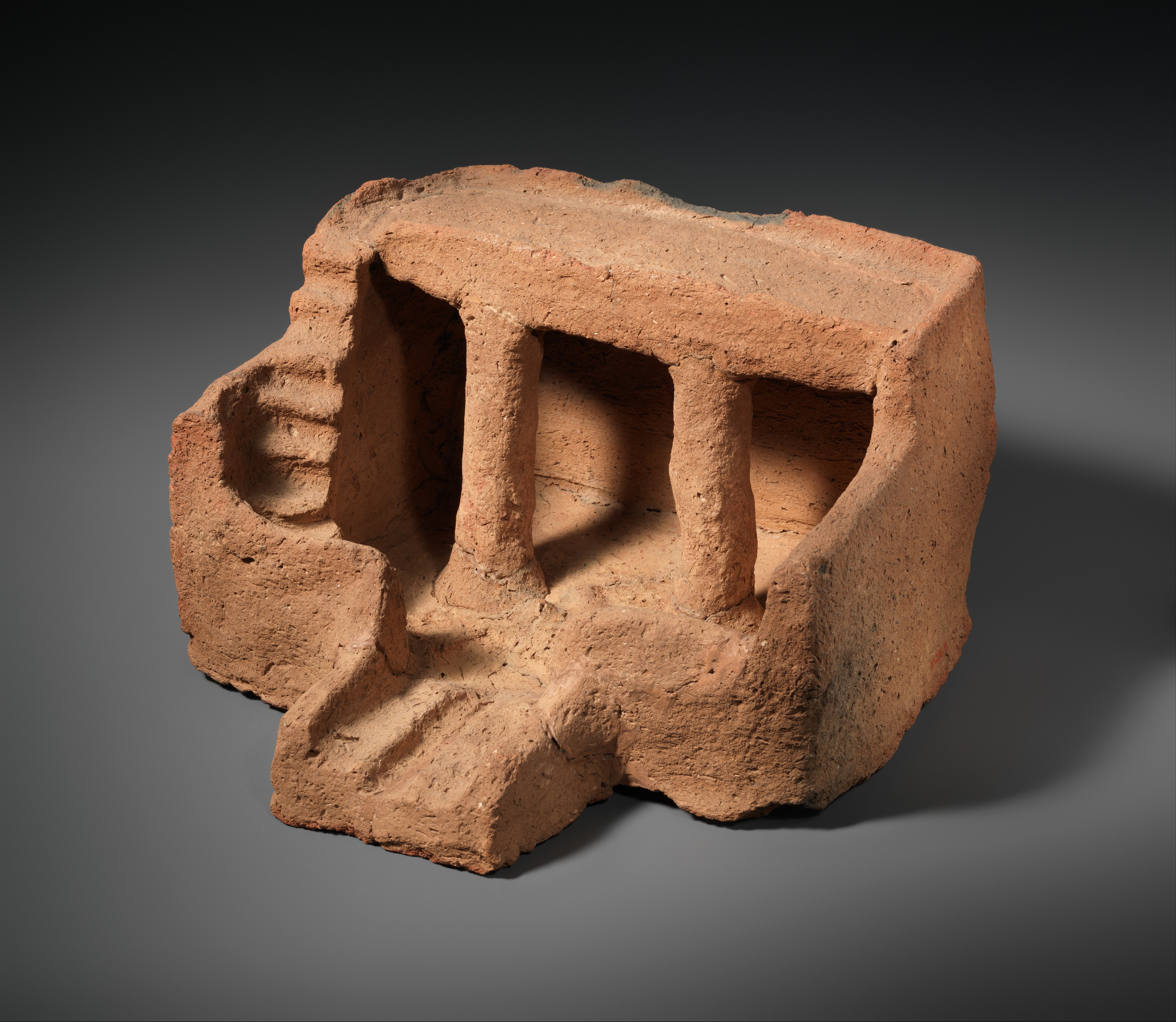
Model of a house; 1750–1700 BC; pottery; 27 x 27 x 17 cm; Metropolitan Museum of Art

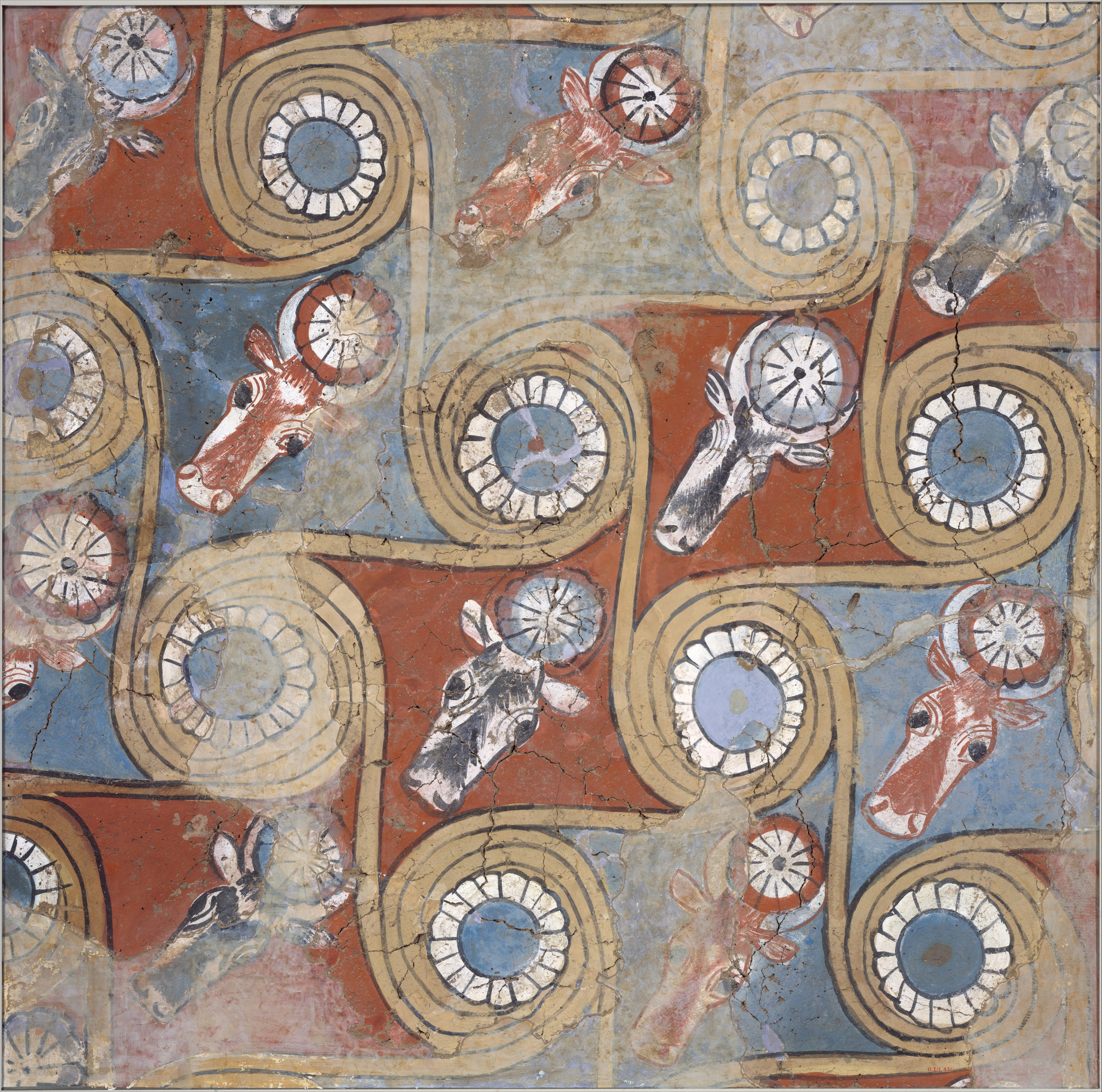
Ceiling painting from the palace of Amenhotep III; circa 1390–1353 BC; dried mud, mud plaster and paint Gesso; 140 x 140 cm; Metropolitan Museum of Art

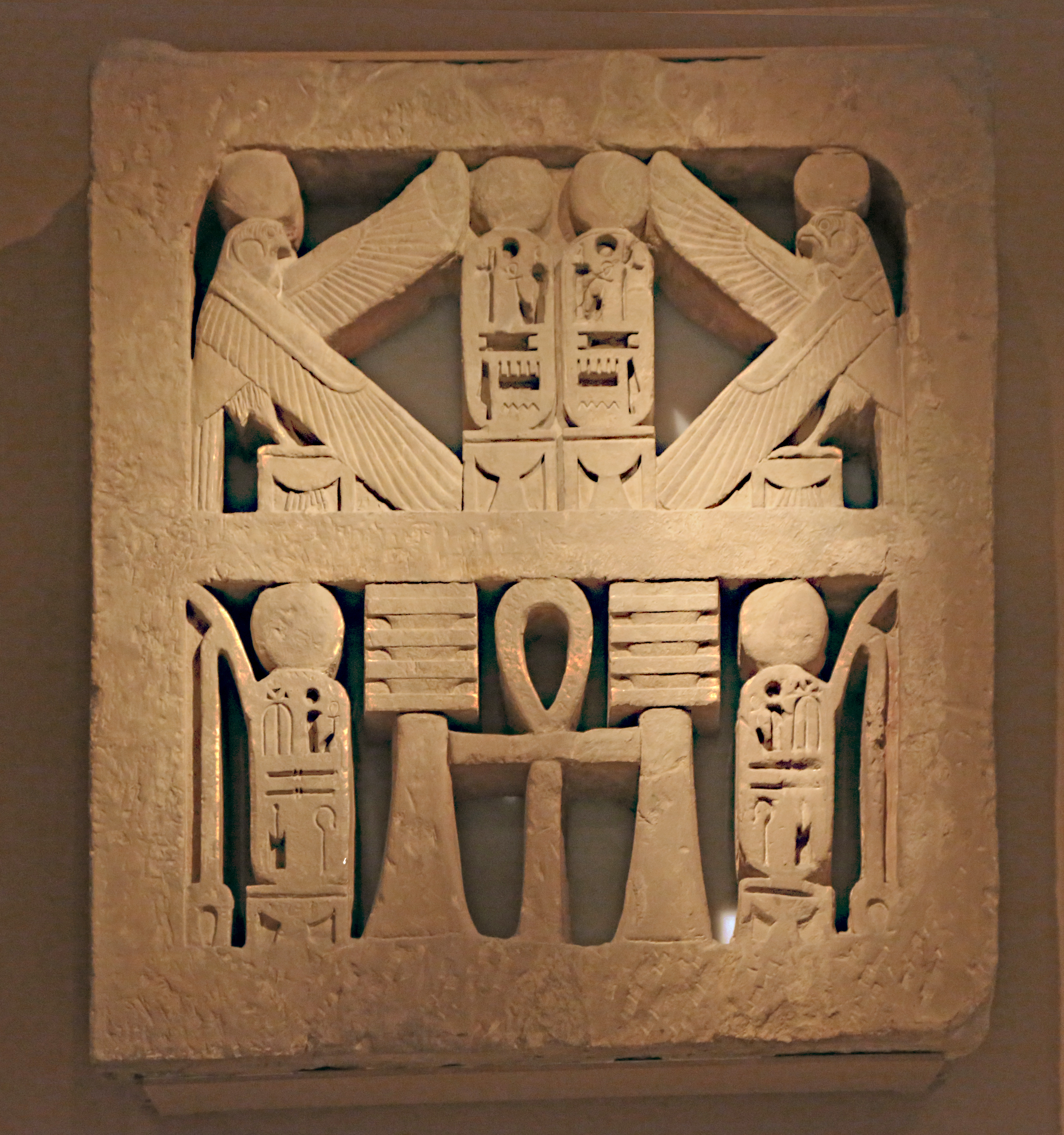
Window grill from a palace of Ramesses III; 1184–1153 BC; painted sandstone; height: 103.5 cm, width: 102.9 cm, depth: 14.6 cm; Metropolitan Museum of Art

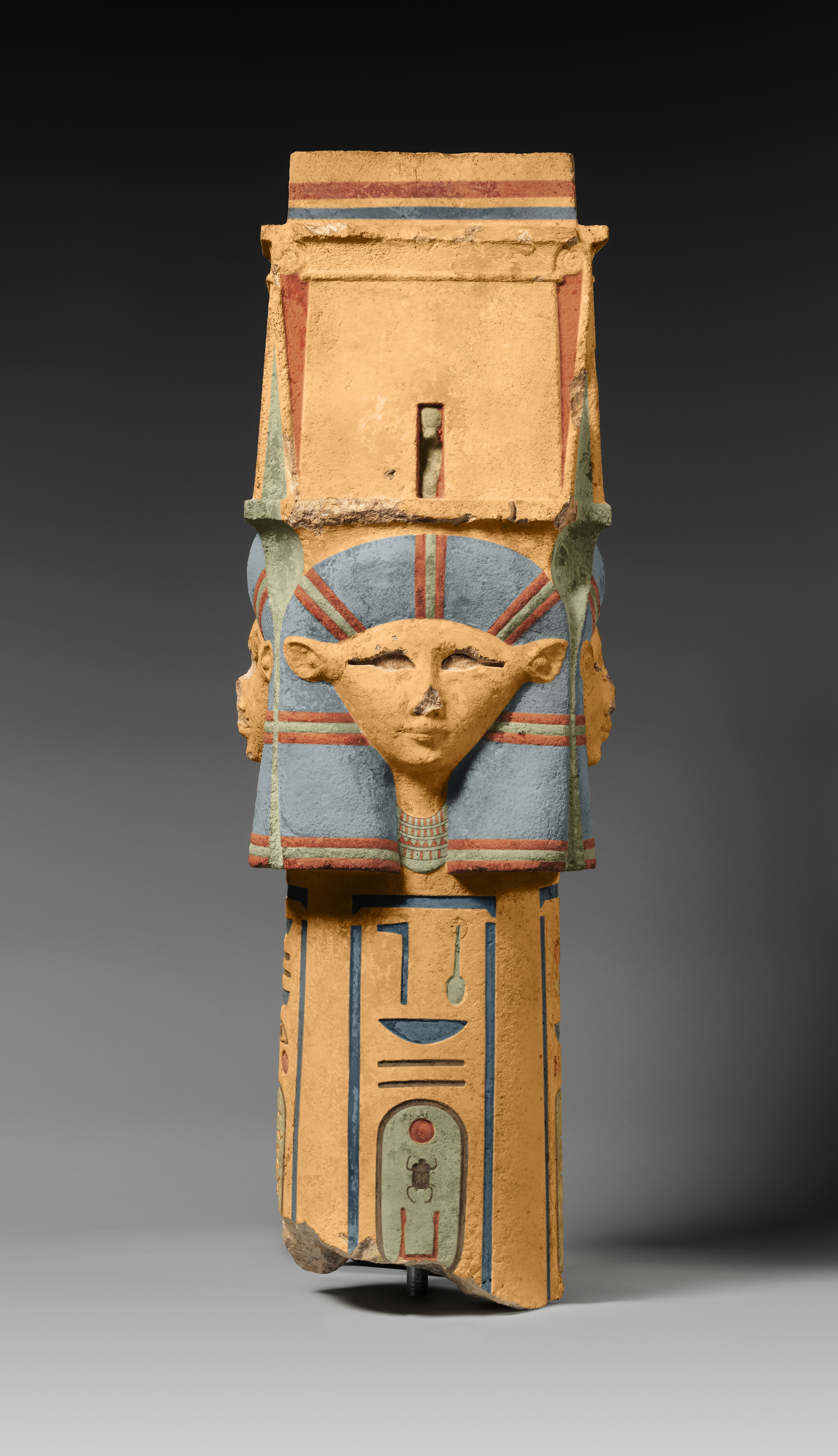
Column with Hathor-emblem capital and names of Nectanebo I on the shaft; 380–362 BC; limestone; height: 102 cm, width: 34.3 cm; Metropolitan Museum of Art

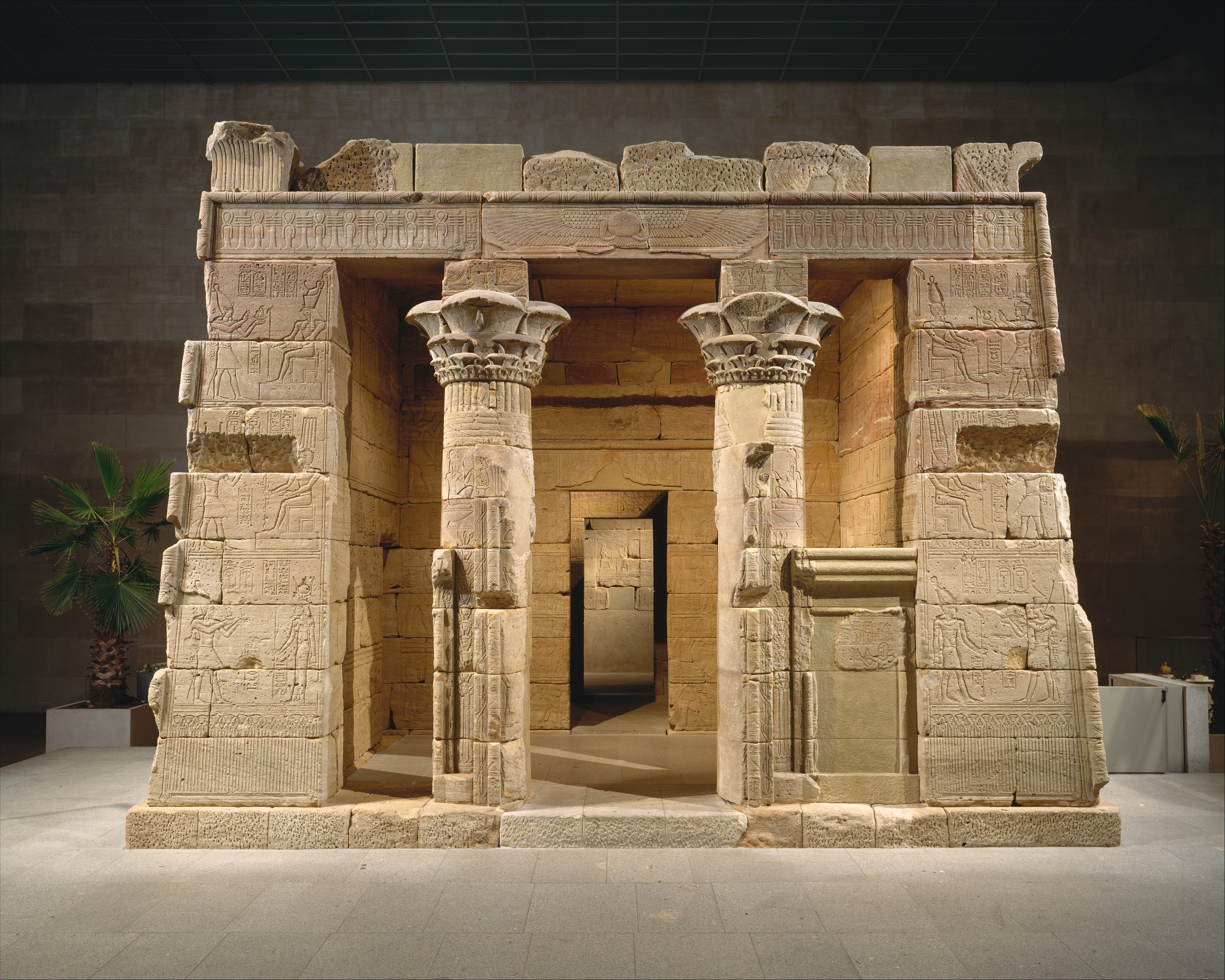
The Temple of Dendur; completed by 10 BC; aeolian sandstone; temple proper: height: 6.4 m, width: 6.4 m; length: 12.5 m; Metropolitan Museum of Art

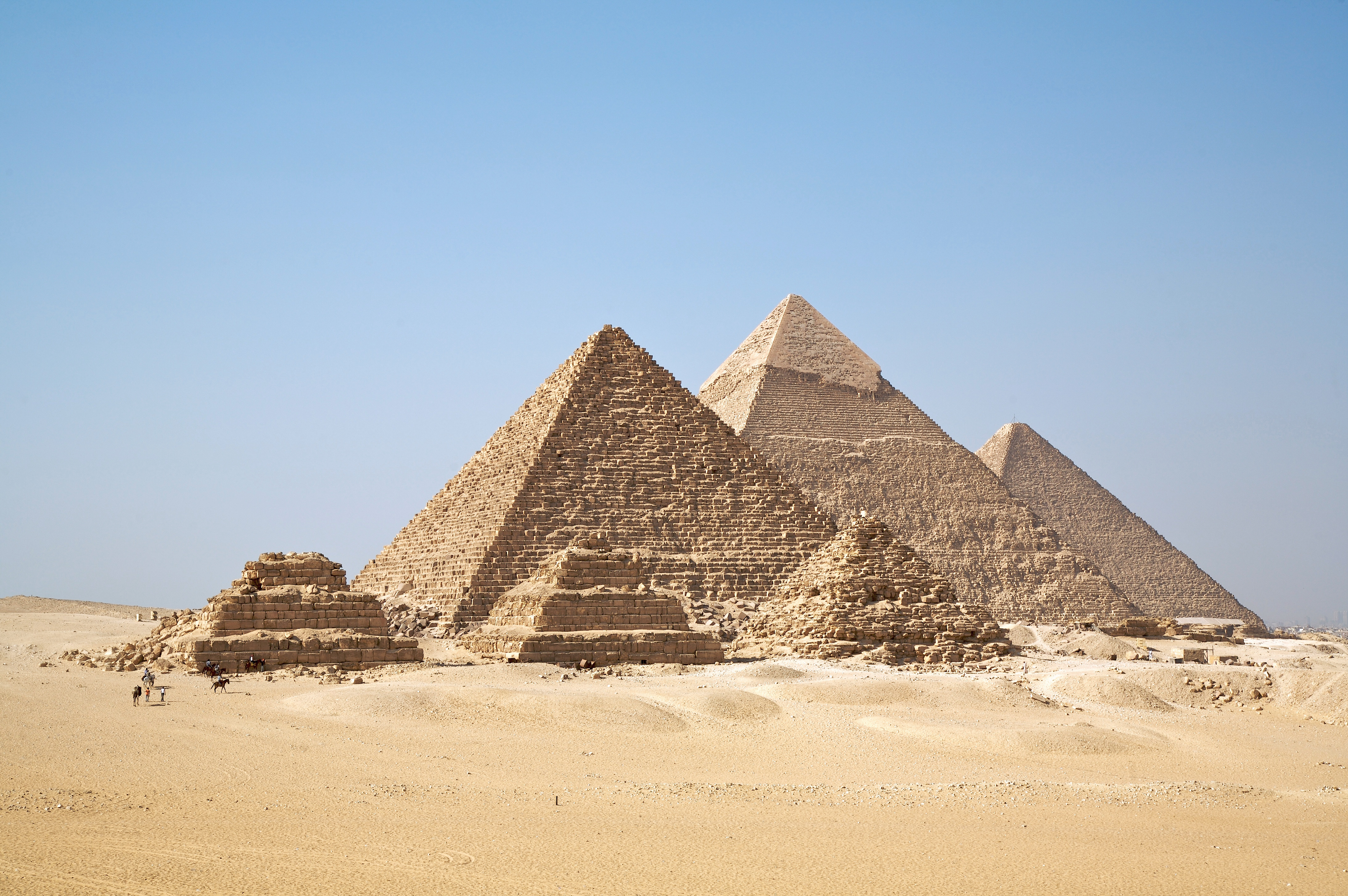
A view of the pyramids at Giza. From left to right, the three largest are: the Pyramid of Menkaure, the Pyramid of Khafre and the Great Pyramid of Khufu

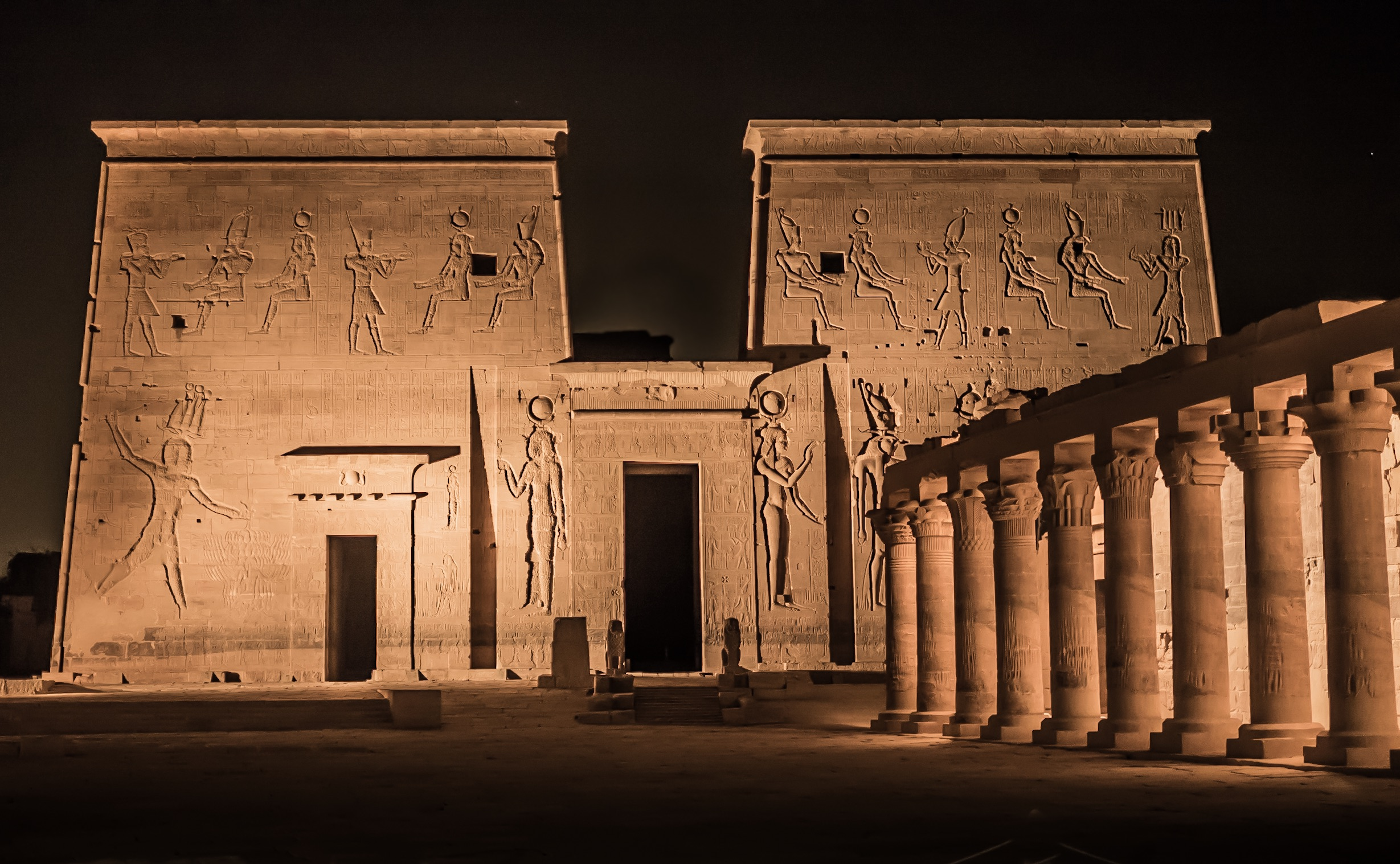
The well preserved Temple of Isis from Philae (Egypt) is an example of Egyptian architecture and architectural sculpture

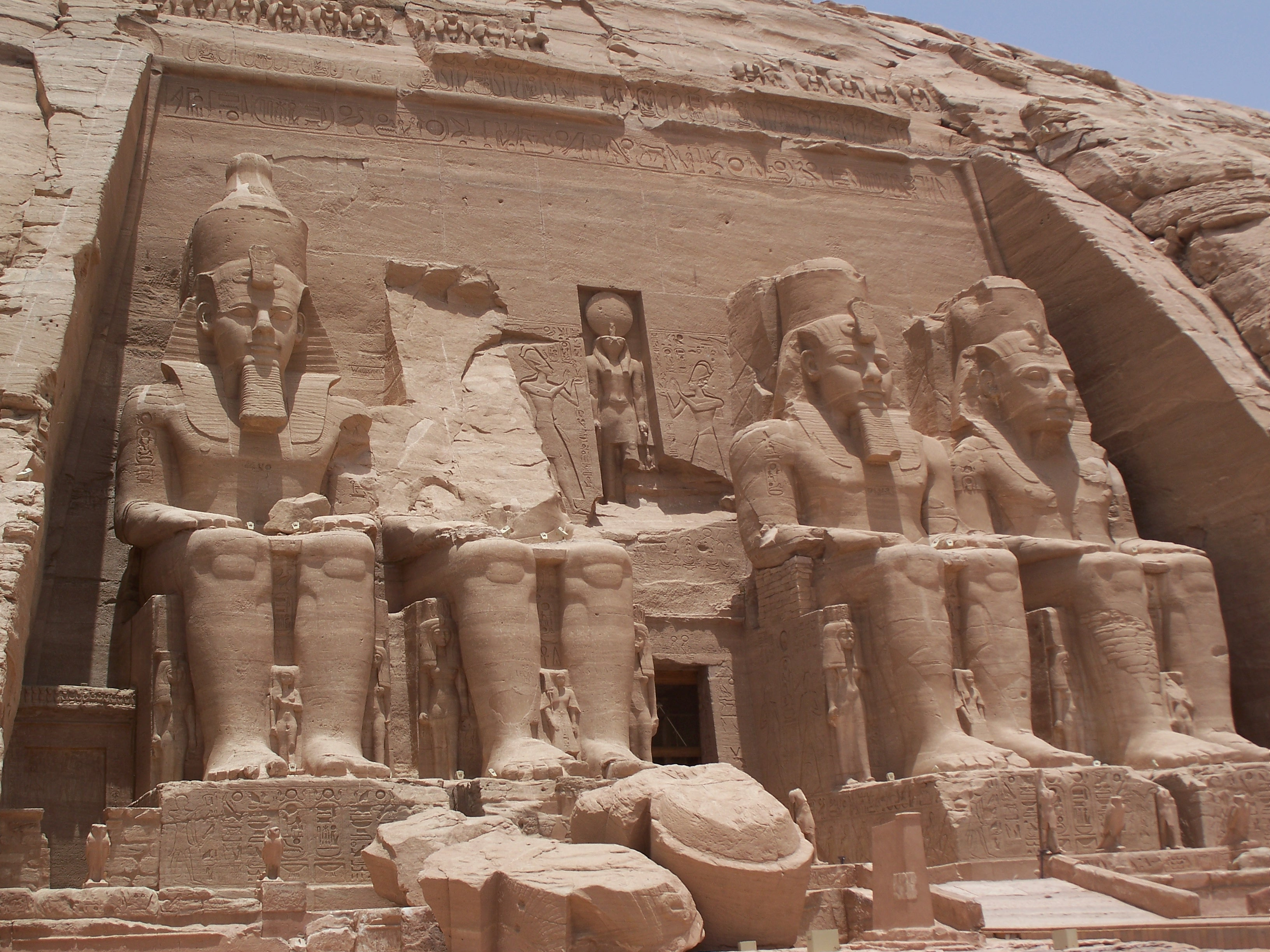
The Great Temple of Ramesses II from Abu Simbel, founded in circa 1264 BC, in the Aswan Governorate (Egypt)

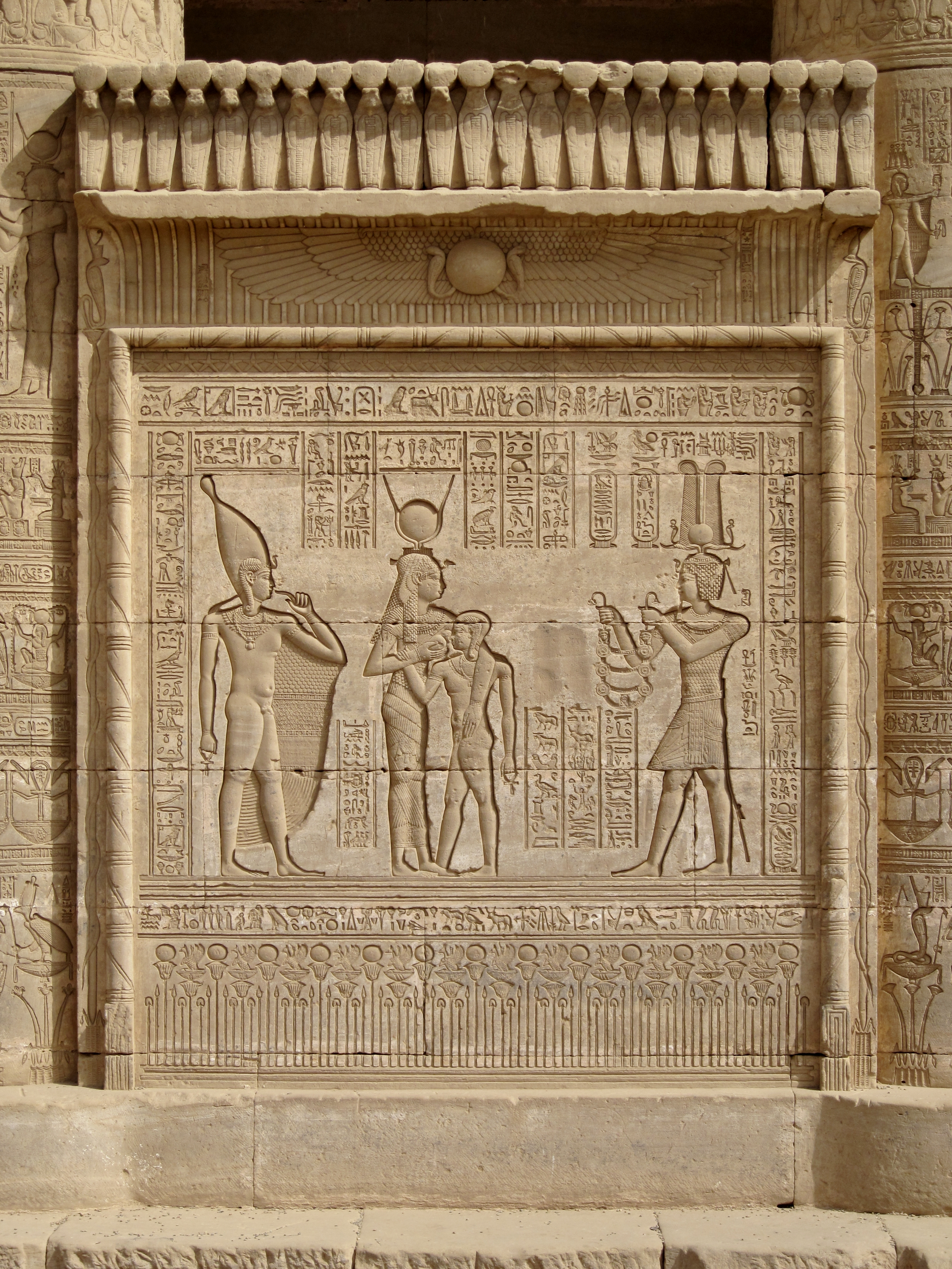
Relief from the Dendera Temple complex (Egypt)

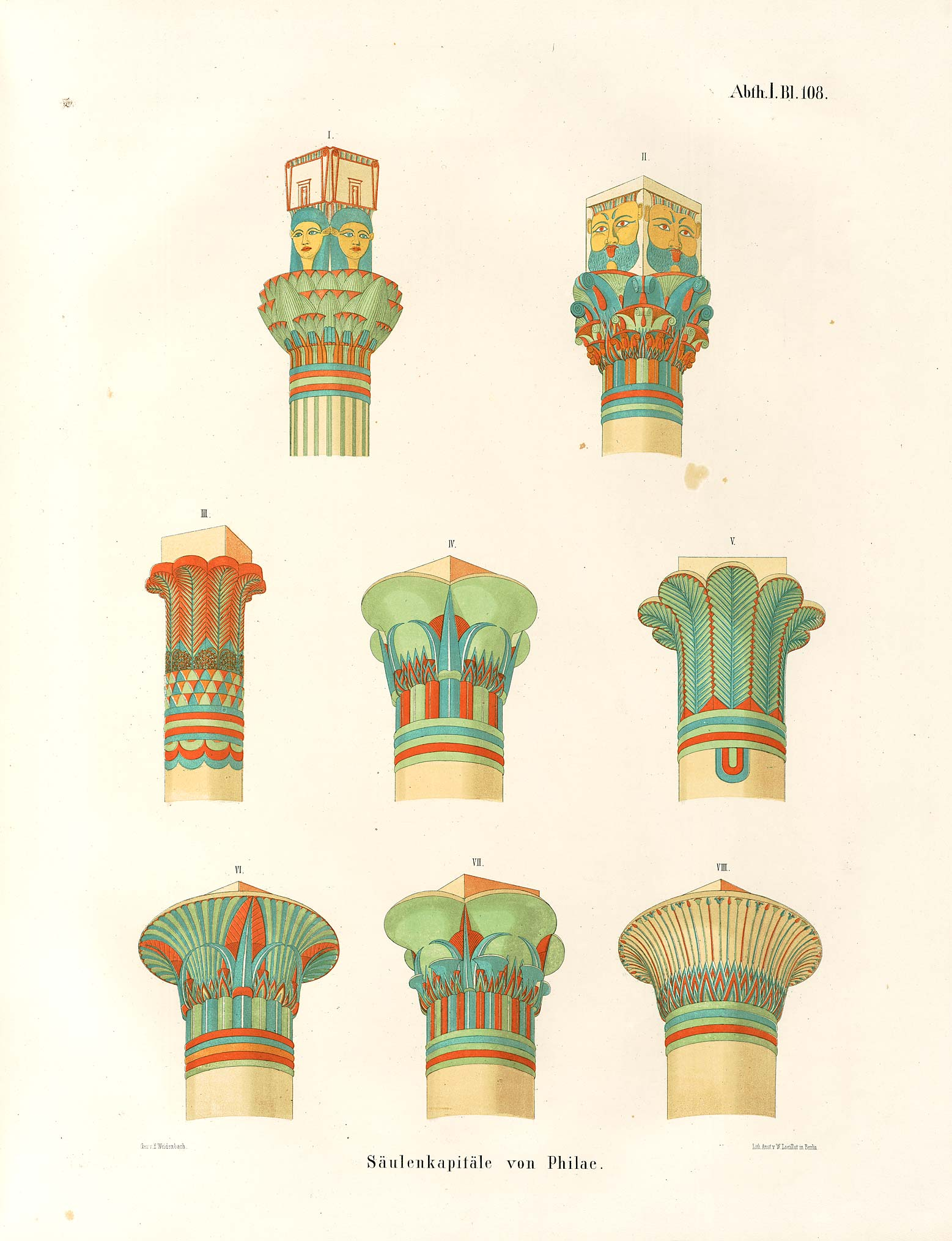
Illustrations of various types of capitals, drawn by the Egyptologist Karl Richard Lepsius

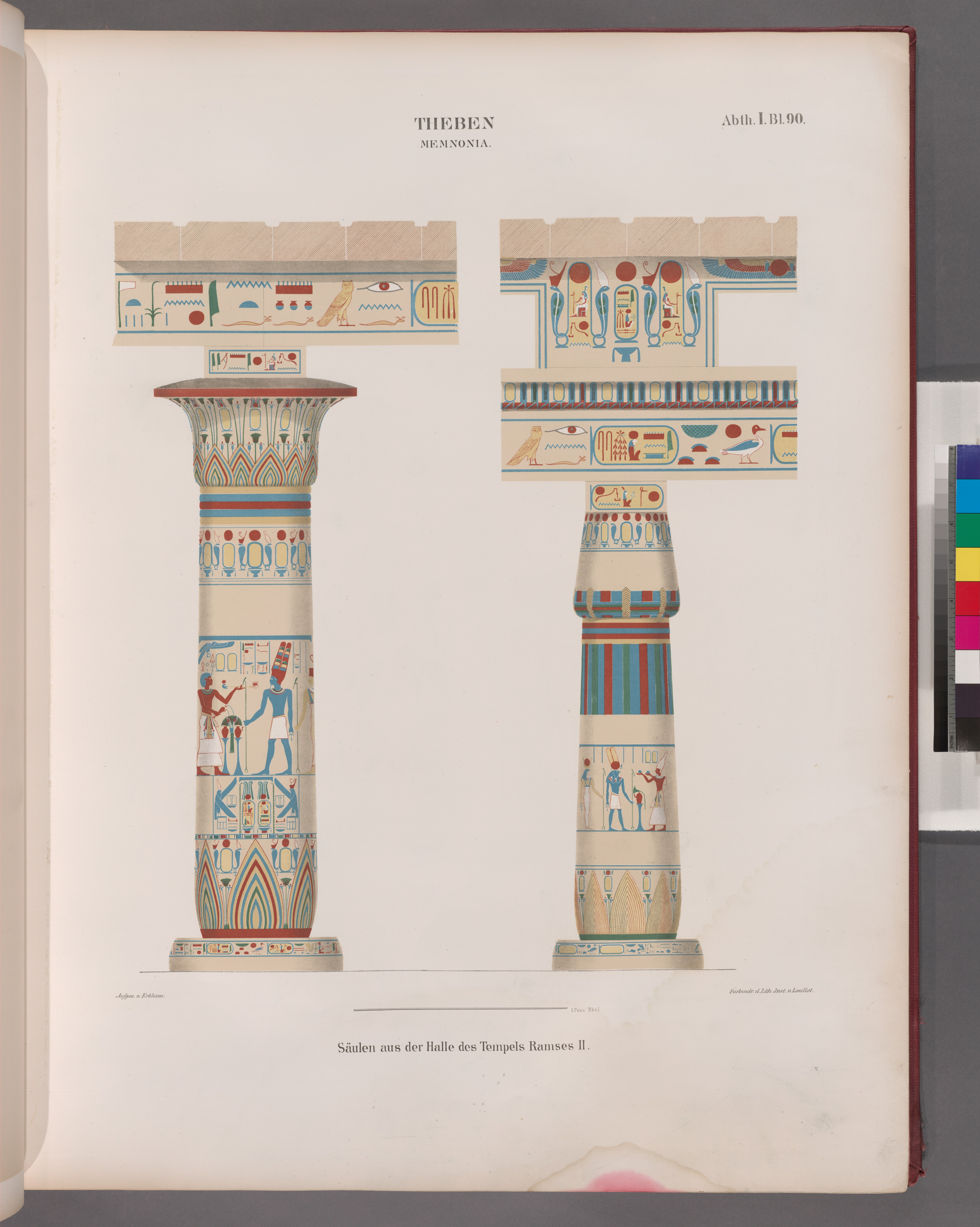
Illustrations with two types of columns from the hall of the Ramses II Temple, drawn in 1849

== Jewelry ==
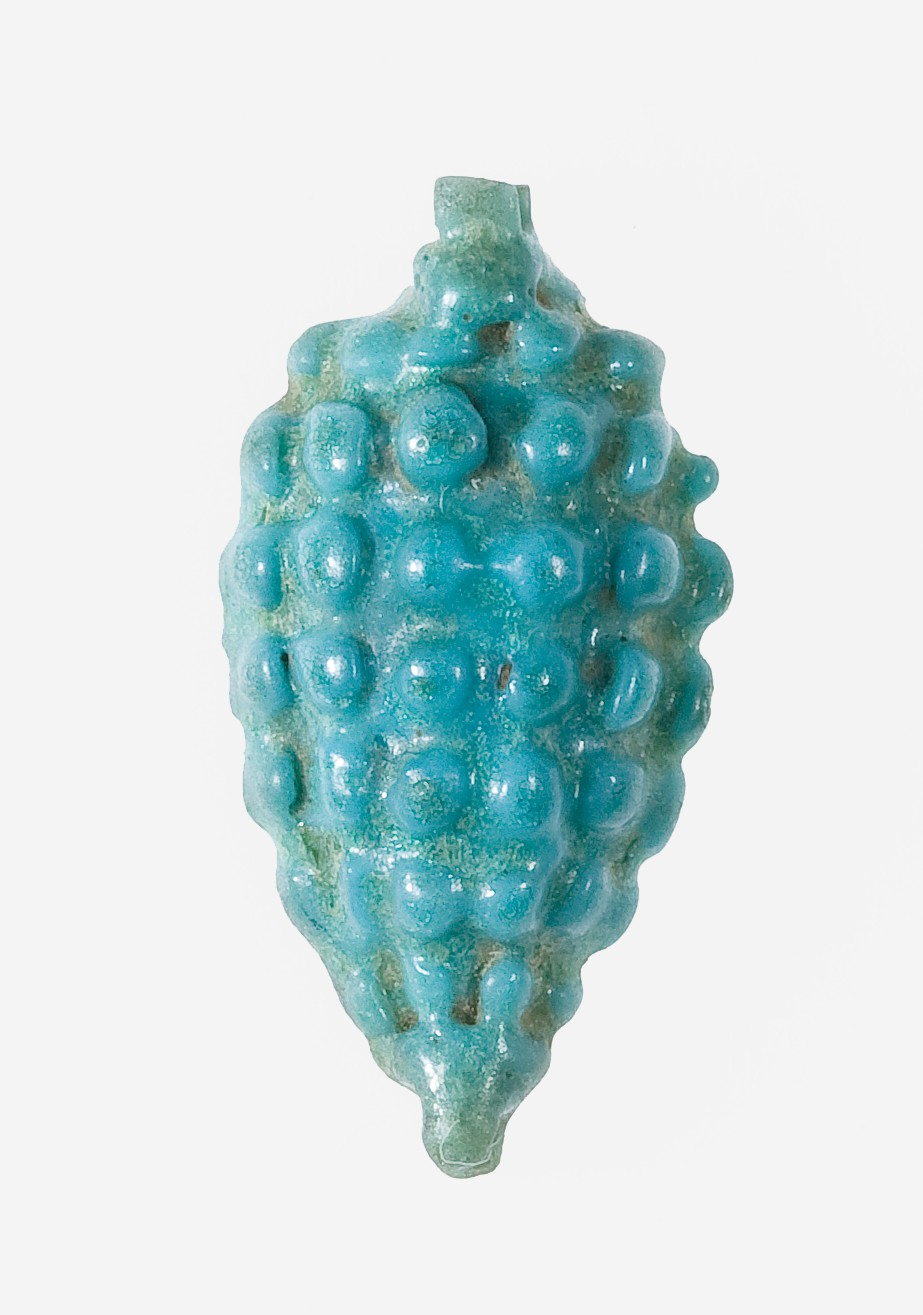
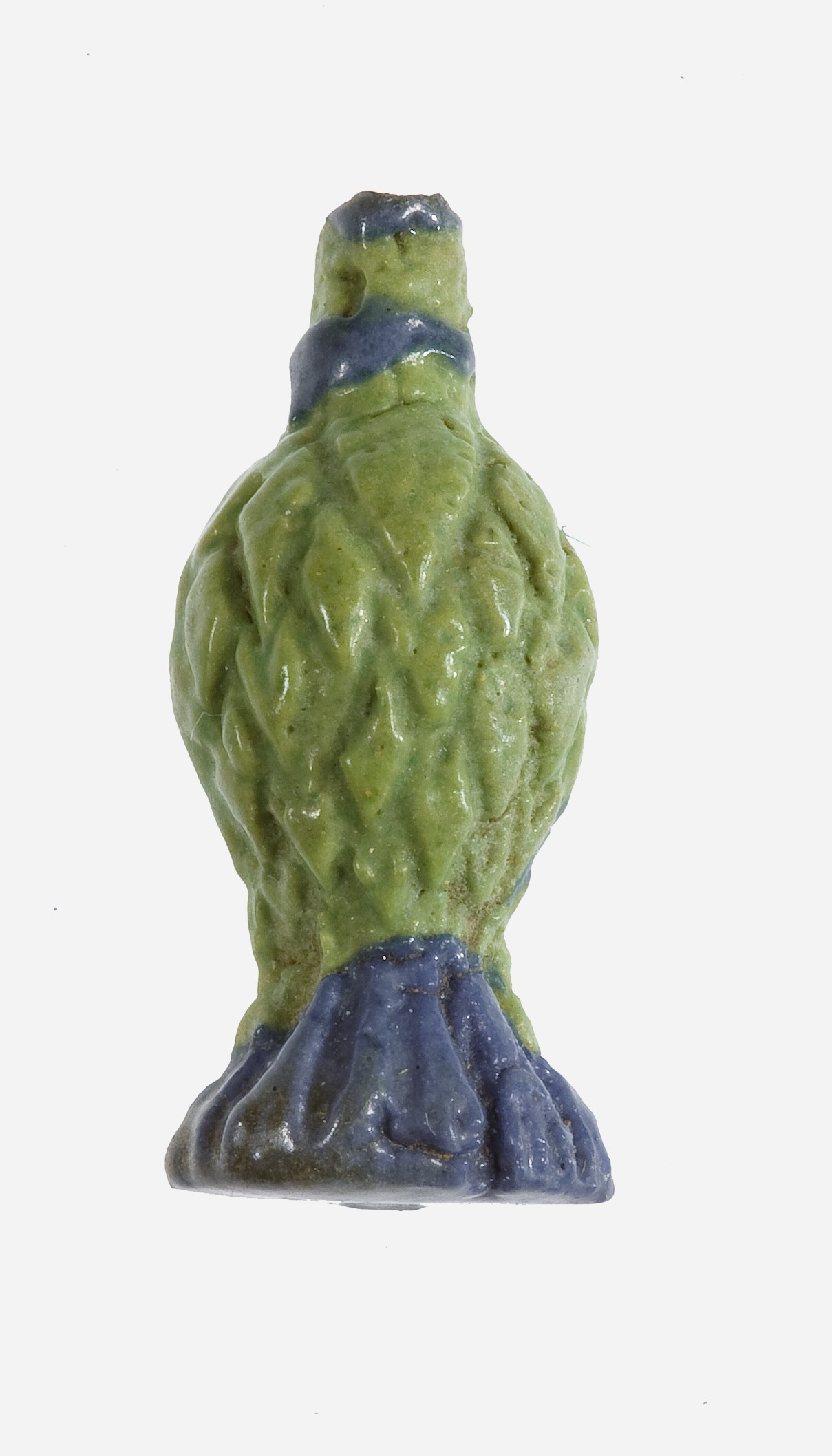
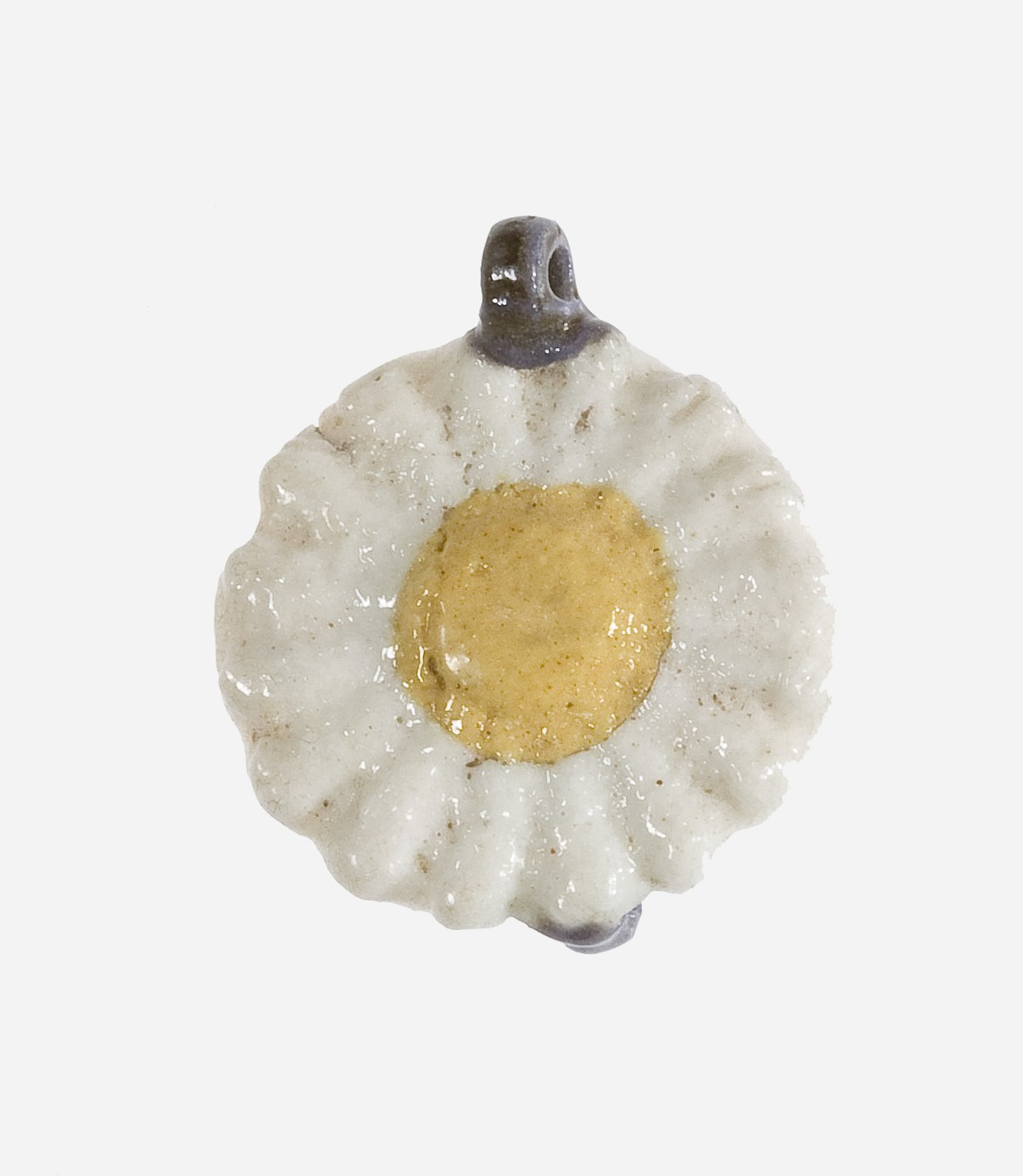
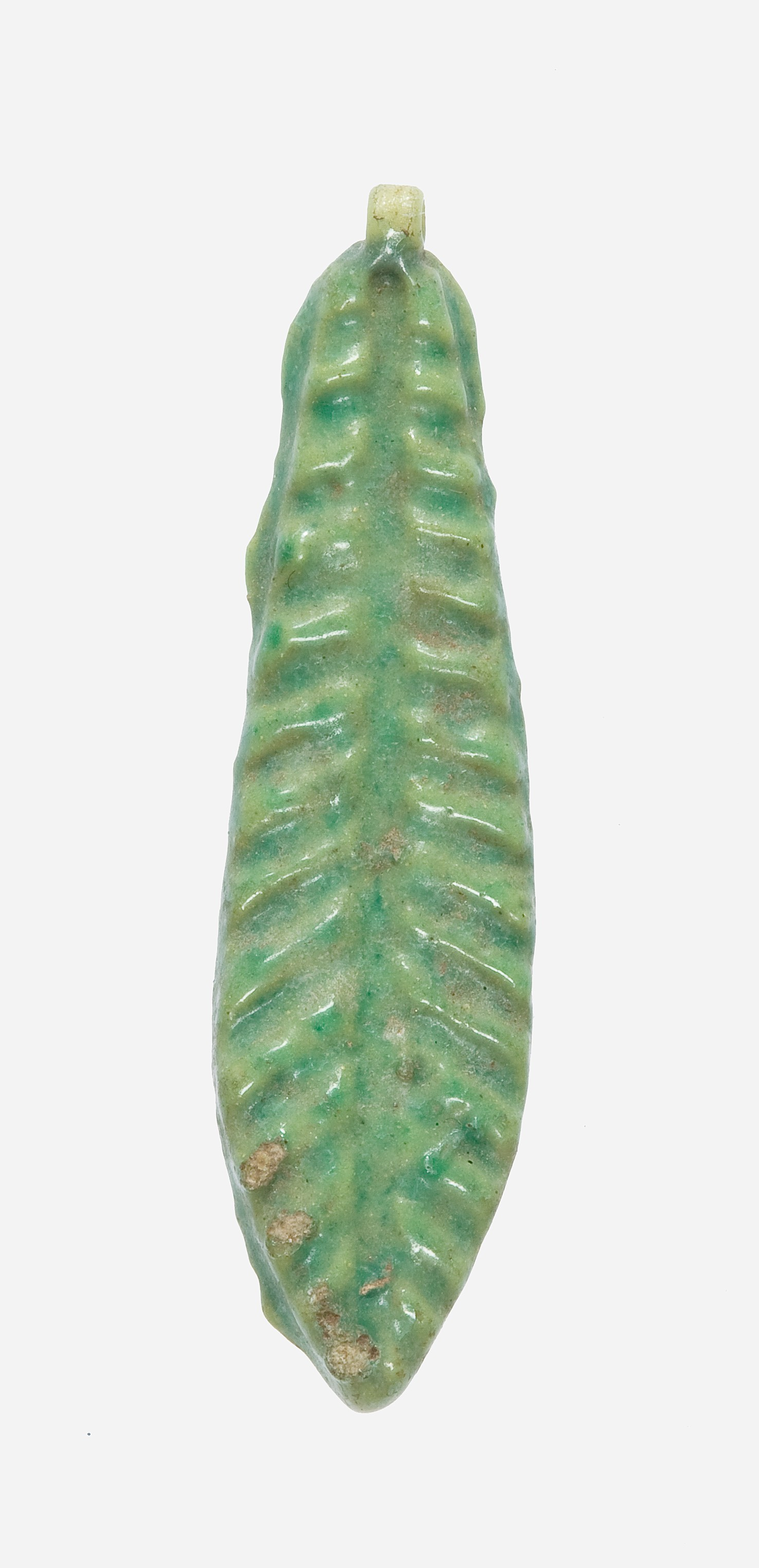
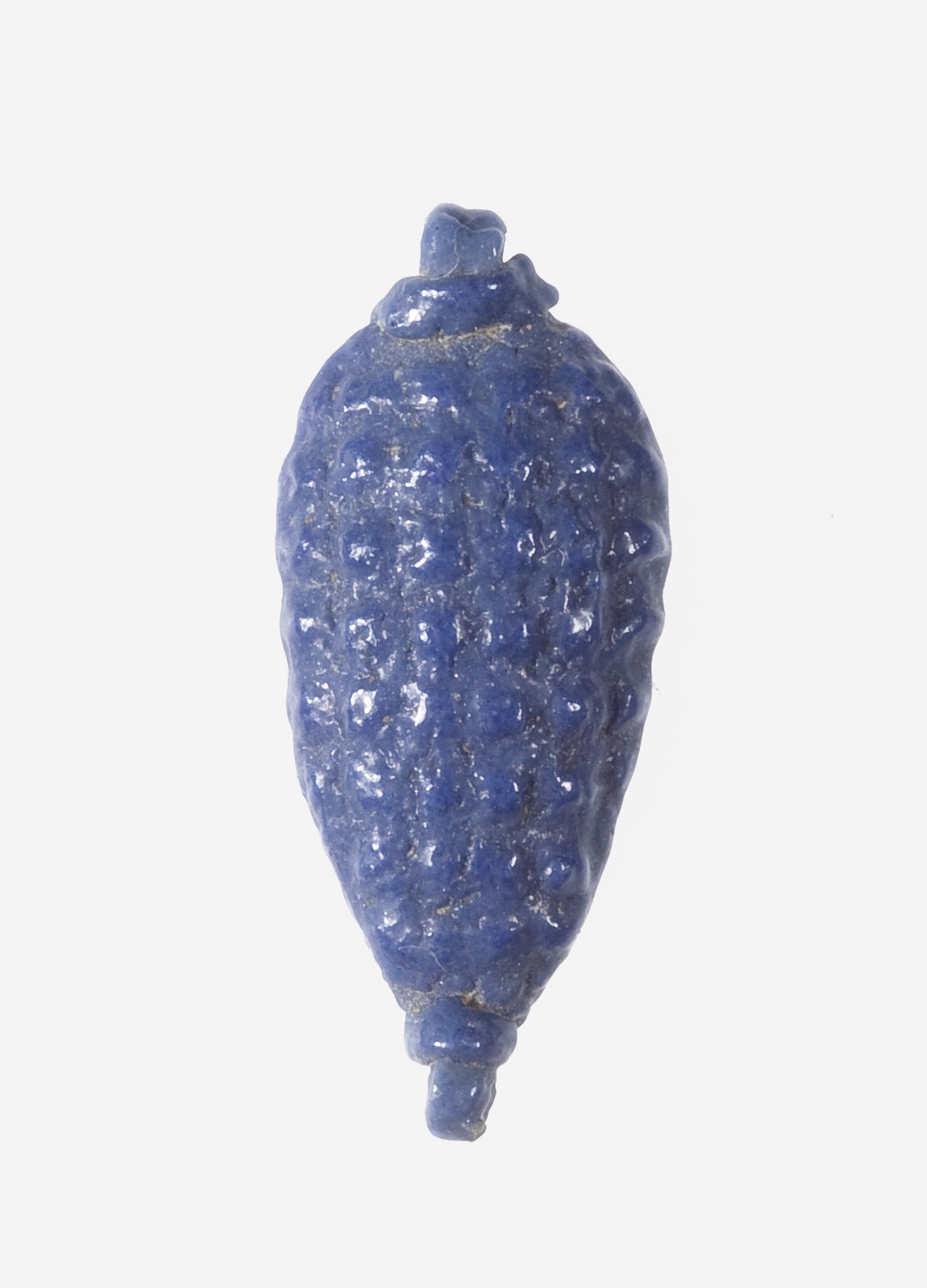
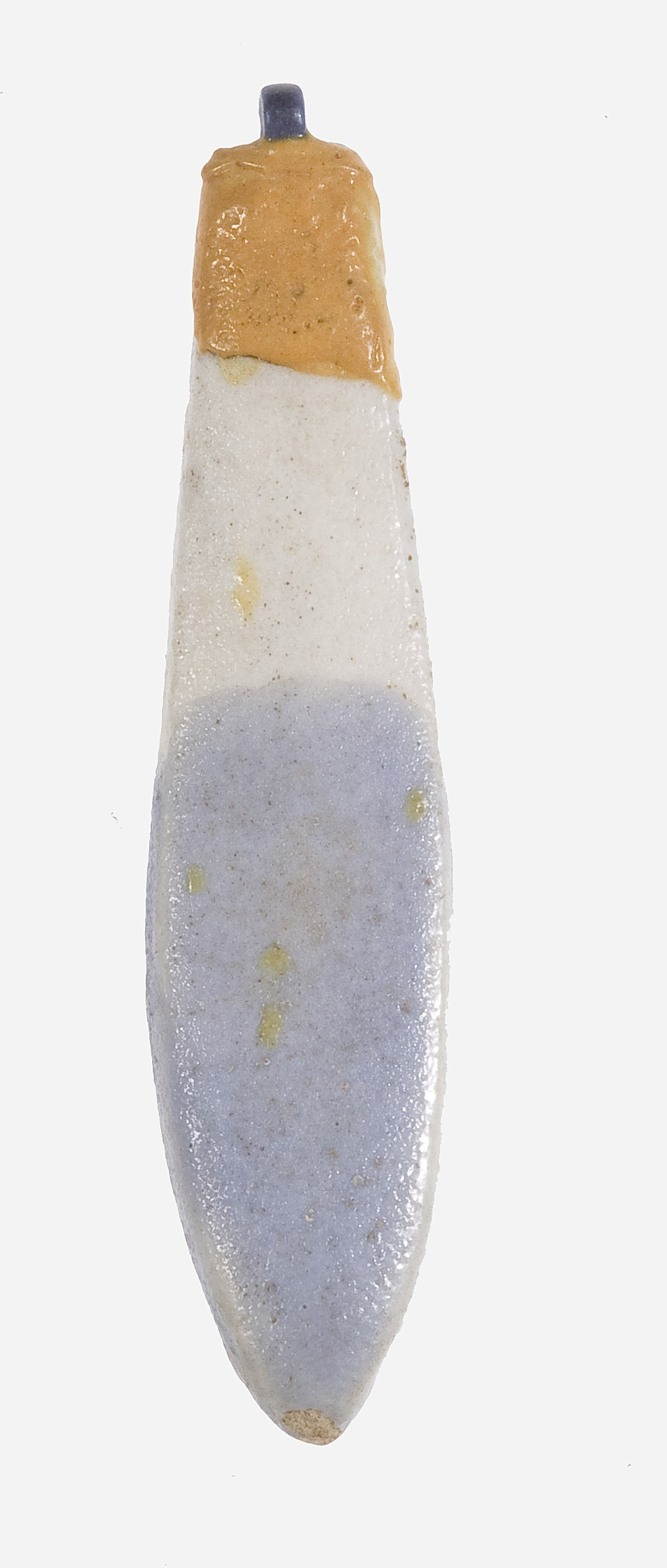
Various beads from the Metropolitan Museum of Art (New York City)

The ancient Egyptians exhibited a love of ornament and personal decoration from earliest Predynastic times. Badarian burials often contained strings of beads made from glazed steatite, shell and ivory. Jewelry in gold, silver, copper and faience is also attested in the early Predynastic period; more varied materials were introduced in the centuries preceding the 1st Dynasty. By the Old Kingdom, the combination of carnelian, turquoise and lapis lazuli had been established for royal jewelry, and this was to become standard in the Middle Kingdom. Less sophisticated pieces might use bone, mother-of-pearl or cowrie shells.

The particular choice of materials depended upon practical, aesthetical and symbolic considerations. Some types of jewelry remained perennially popular, while others went in and out of fashion. In the first category were bead necklaces, bracelets, armlets and girdles. Bead aprons are first attested in the 1st Dynasty, while usekh broad collars became a standard type from the early Old Kingdom. In the Middle Kingdom, they had fallen from favor, to be replaced by finger-rings and ear ornaments (rings and plugs). New Kingdom jewelry is generally more elaborate and garish than that of earlier periods, and was influenced by styles from the Ancient Greece and the Levant. Many fine examples were found in the tomb of Tutankhamun. Jewelry, both royal and private, was replete with religious symbolism. It was also used to display the wealth and rank of the wearer. Royal jewels were always the most elaborate, as exemplified by the pieces found at Dahshur and Lahun, made for princesses of the 18th Dynasty, favored courtiers were rewarded with the "gold of honor" as a sign of royal favor.

The techniques of jewelry-making can be reconstructed from surviving artifacts and from tomb decoration. A jeweler's workshop is shown in the tomb of Mereruka; several New Kingdom tombs at Thebes contain similar scenes.

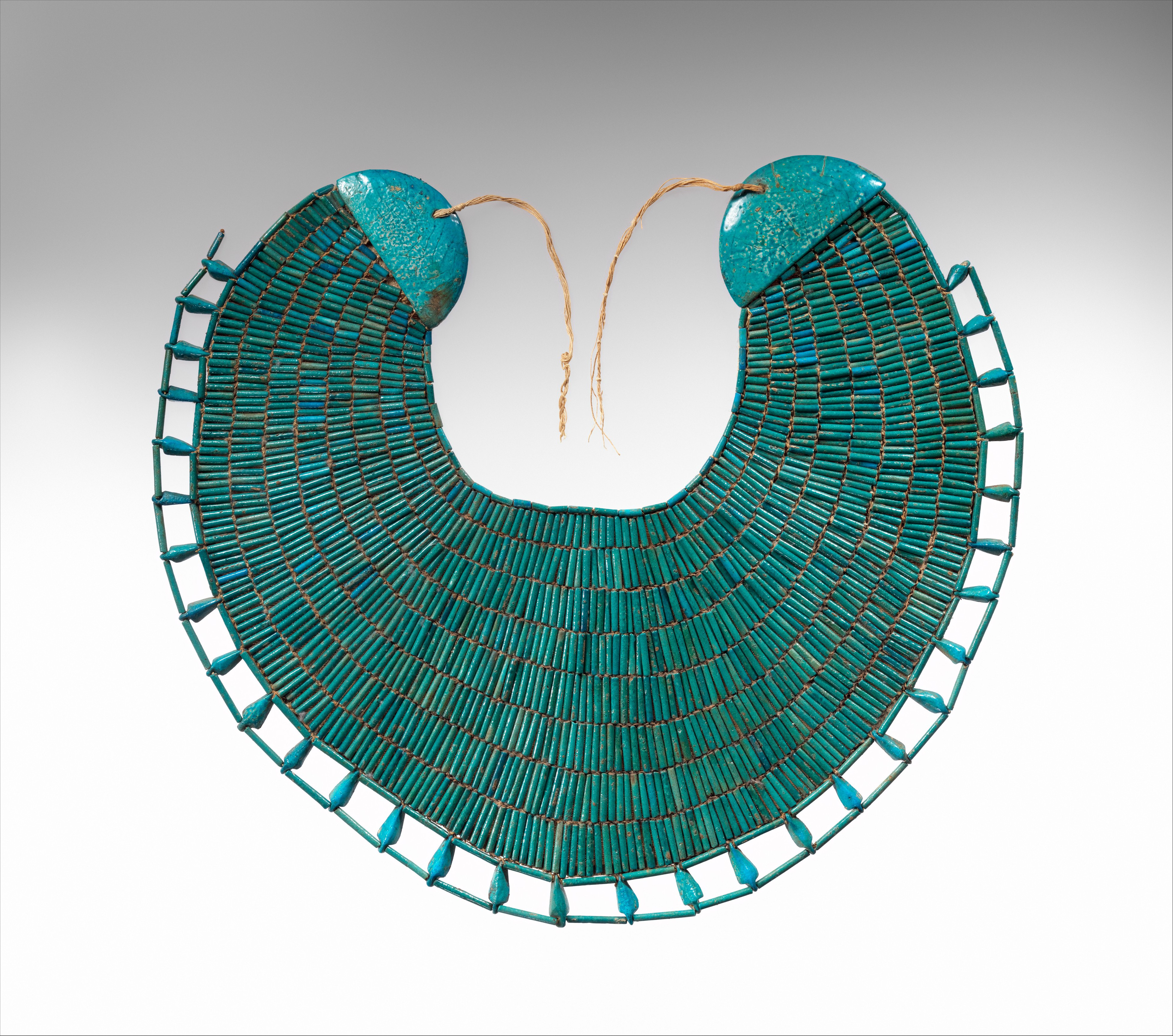
Broad collar of Wah; 1981–1975 BC; faience and linen thread; height: 34.5 cm, width: 39 cm; Metropolitan Museum of Art (New York City)

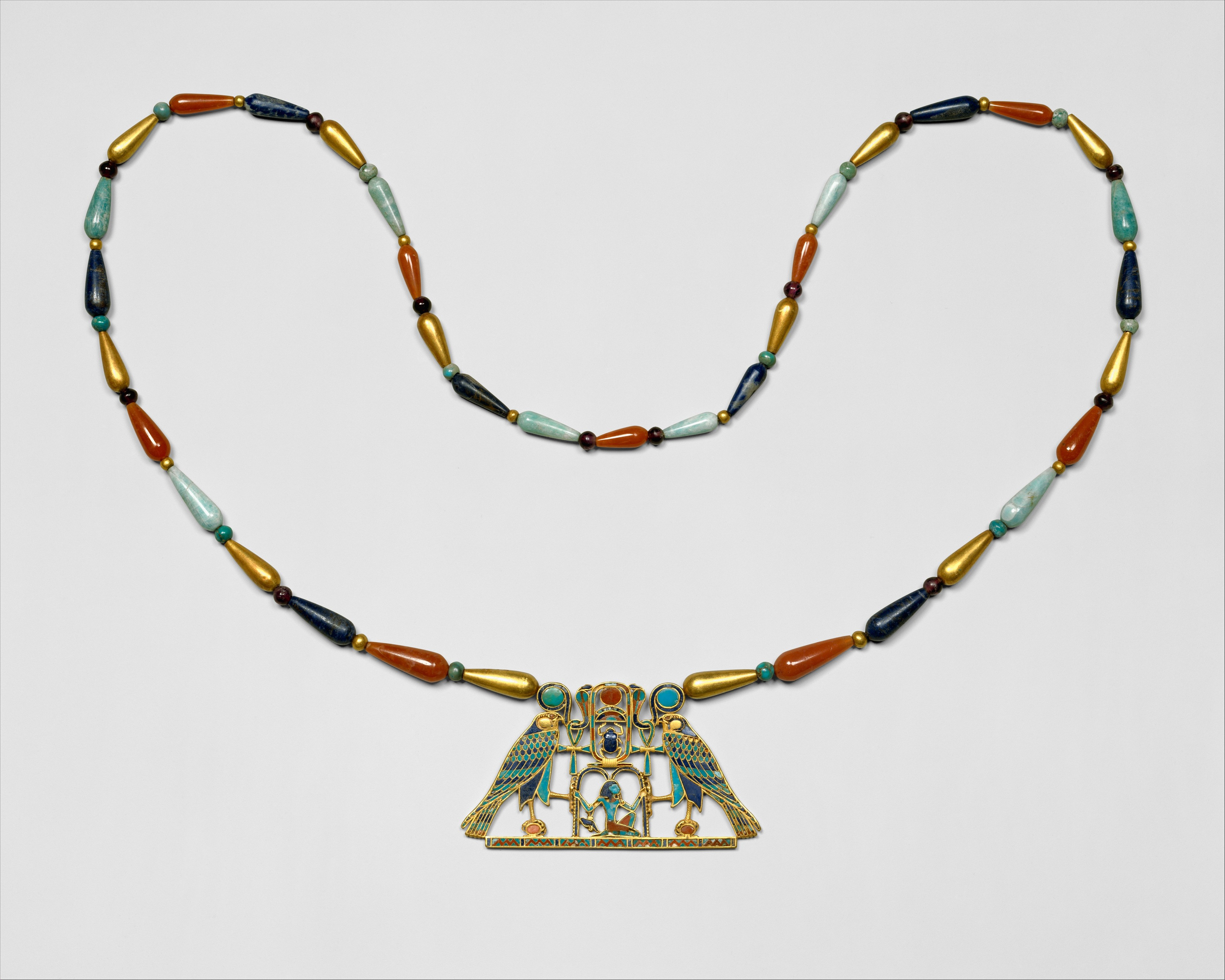
Pectoral and necklace of Princess Sithathoriunet; 1887–1813 BC; gold, carnelian, lapis lazuli, turquoise, garnet & feldspar; height of the pectoral: 4.5 cm; Metropolitan Museum of Art

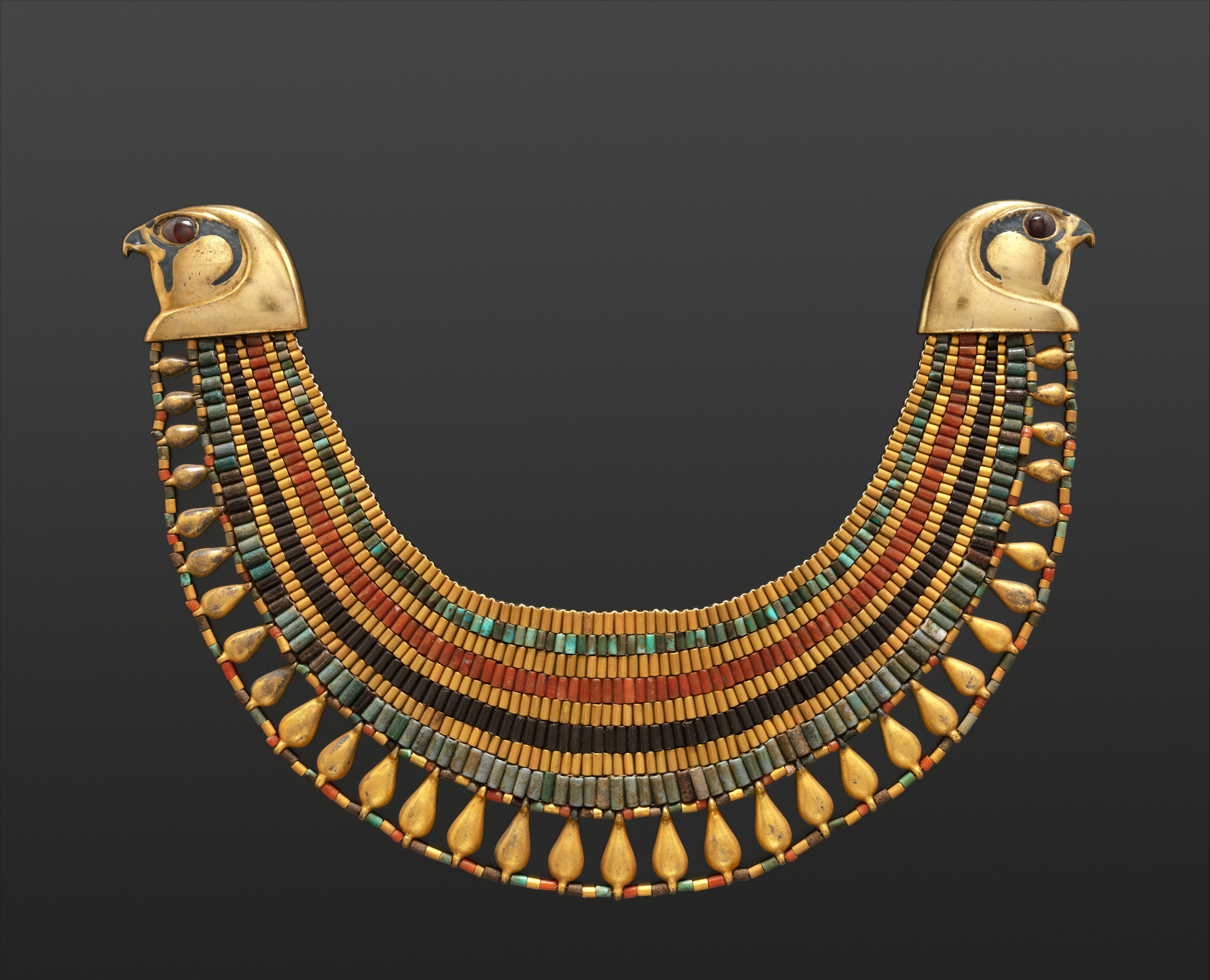
Broad collar of Senebtisi; 1850–1775 BC; faience, gold, carnelian and turquoise; outside diameter: 25 cm, maxim width: 7.5 cm; Metropolitan Museum of Art

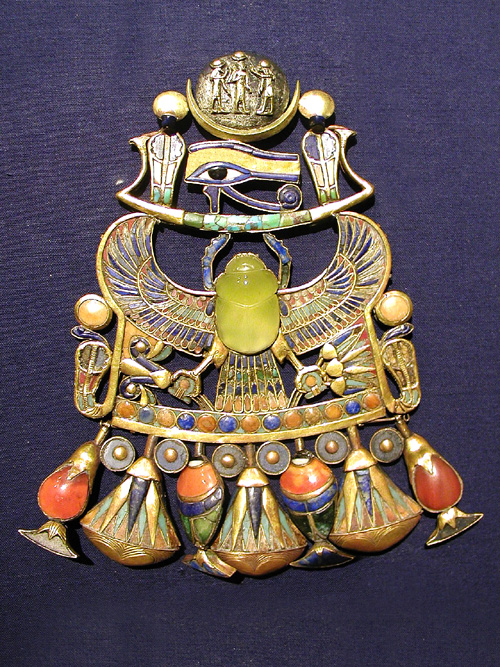
Pectoral (chest jewellery) of Tutankhamun; 1336–1327 BC (Reign of Tutankhamun); gold, silver and meteoric glass; height: 14.9 cm; Egyptian Museum (Cairo)

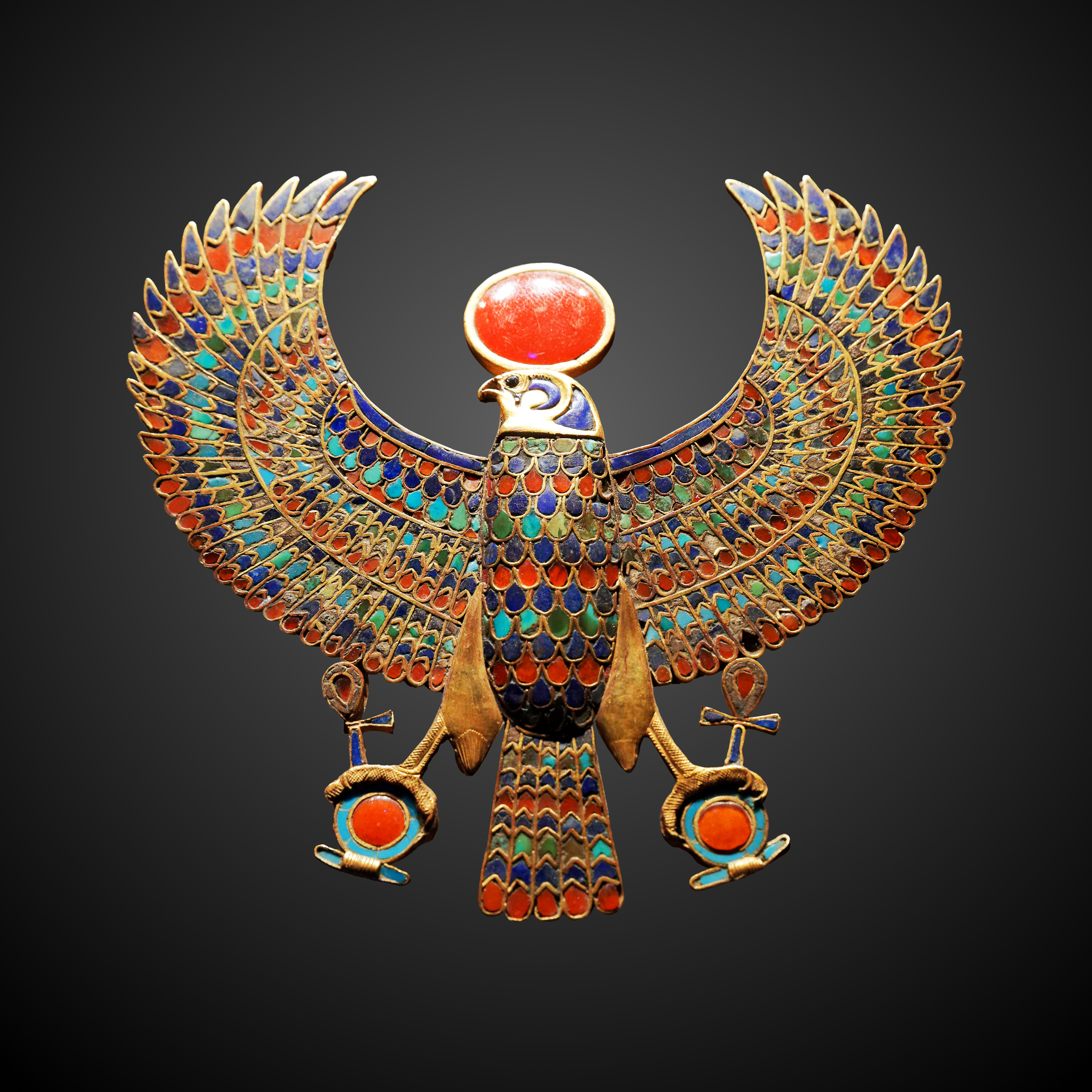
Pectoral of Horus with sundisk; circa 1325 BC; gold with gemstones; width: 12.6 cm; Egyptian Museum (Cairo)

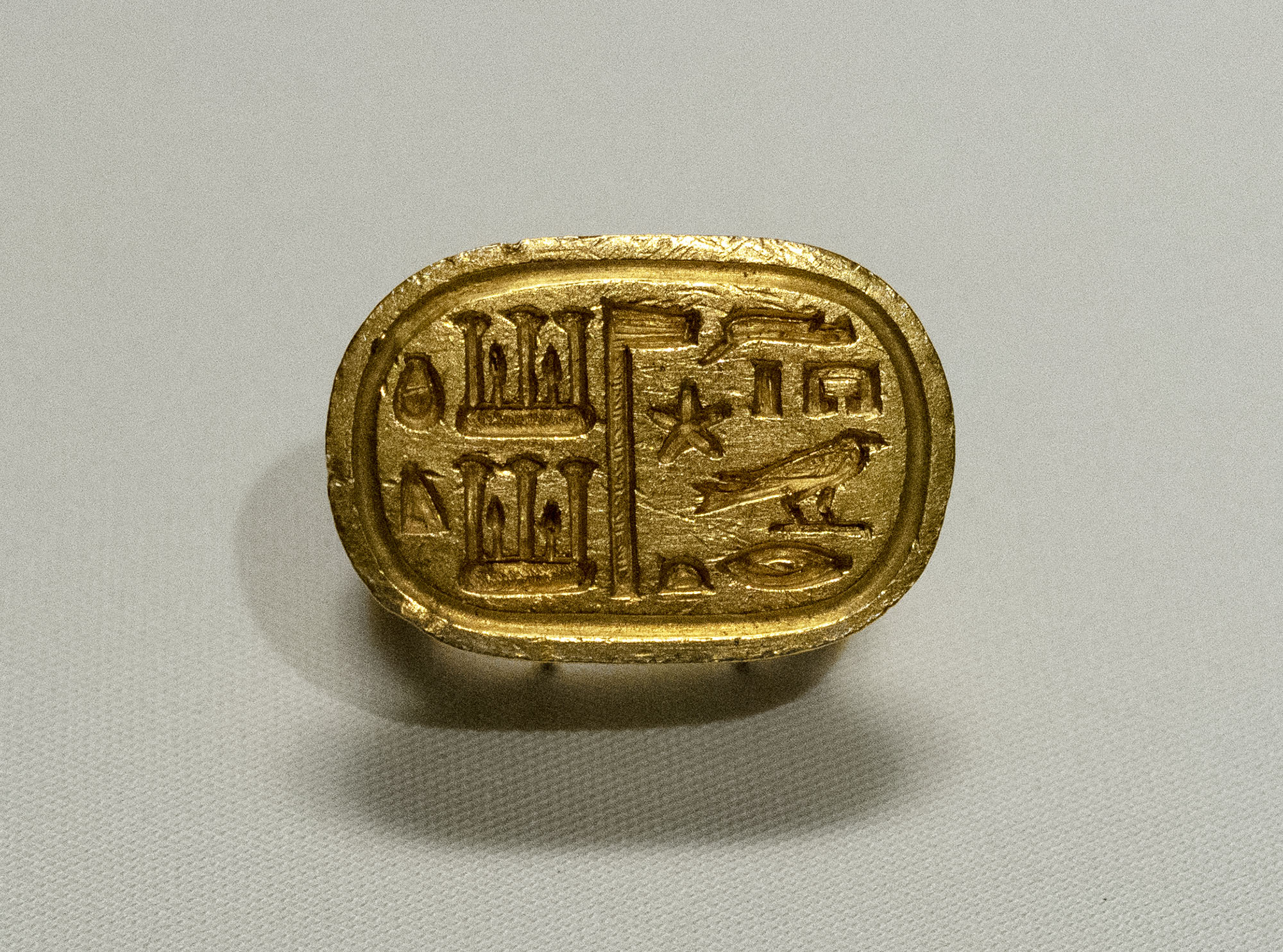
Signet ring; 664–525 BC; gold; diameter 3 cm, length: 3.4 cm (bezel); British Museum (London)

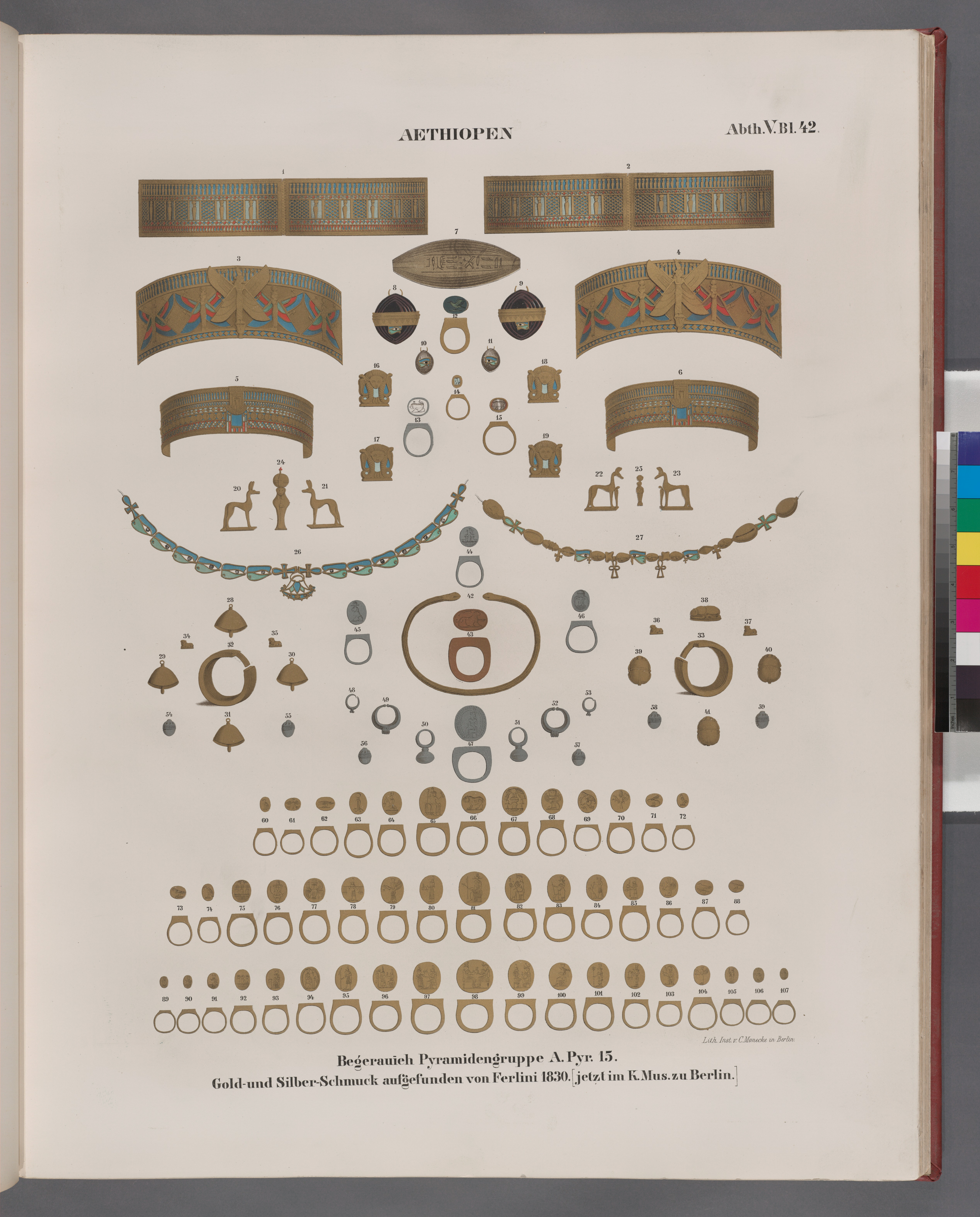
1849 illustrations of the Ferlini Treasures, discovered in 1830 by the Italian explorer, Giuseppe Ferlini; in the New York Public Library

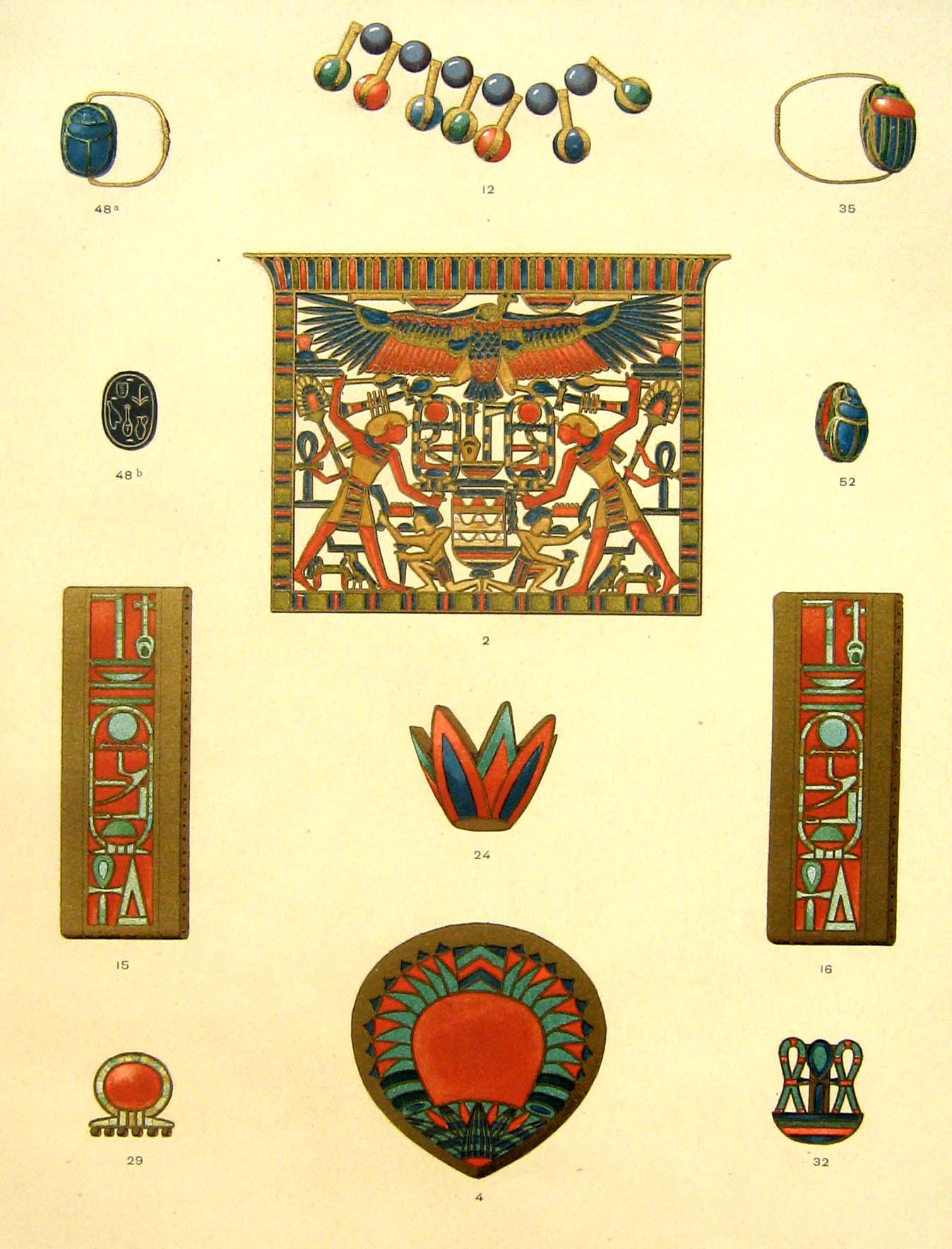
Illustration of jewelry from the tomb of princess Merit

== Amulets ==
An amulet is a small charm worn to afford its owner magical protection, or to convey certain qualities (for example, a lion amulet might convey strength, or a set-square amulet might convey rectitude). Attested from the Badarian period onward, amulets were produced both for the living and the dead. Particular amulets were placed at specific places in the mummy wrappings. The heart scarab was a specialized form of amulet to protect the heart of the deceased in the afterlife. Amulets were made from a wide variety of materials, including faience, glass, and precious stones – with color often playing an important symbolic role – and in a wide variety of forms. They might depict sacred objects (such as the Djed pillar, Tyet girdle or Wedjad eye); animals (bull's head amulets were particularly common in the late Predynastic period); or hieroglyphs (for example, Ankh or Sa). From the New Kingdom onward, deities – especially household deities such as Bes and Taweret – were popular subjects for amulets.

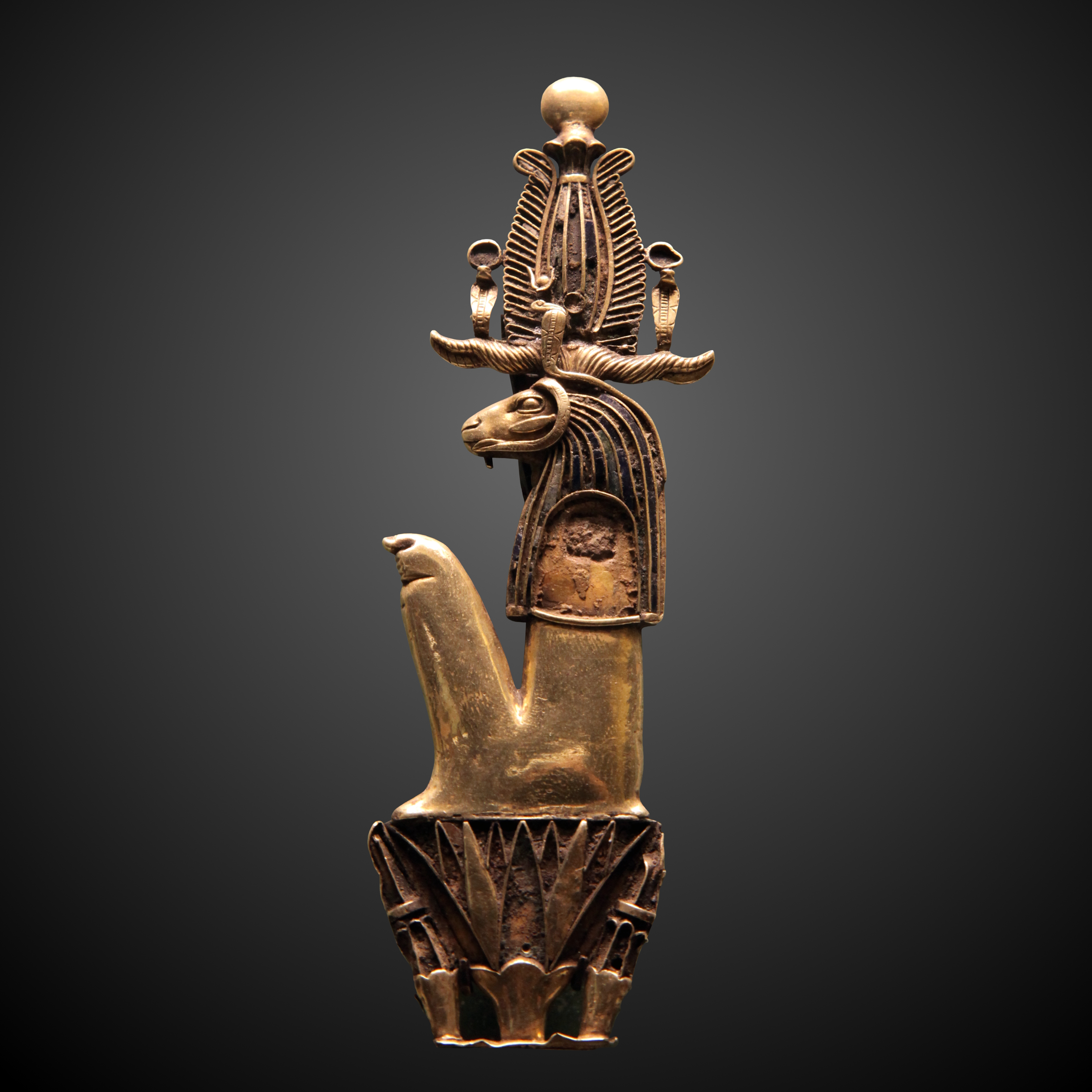
Amulet in the form of Heryshaf seated on a lotus; 1069–332 BC; gold; height: 11.5 cm, width: 3.4 cm; Louvre

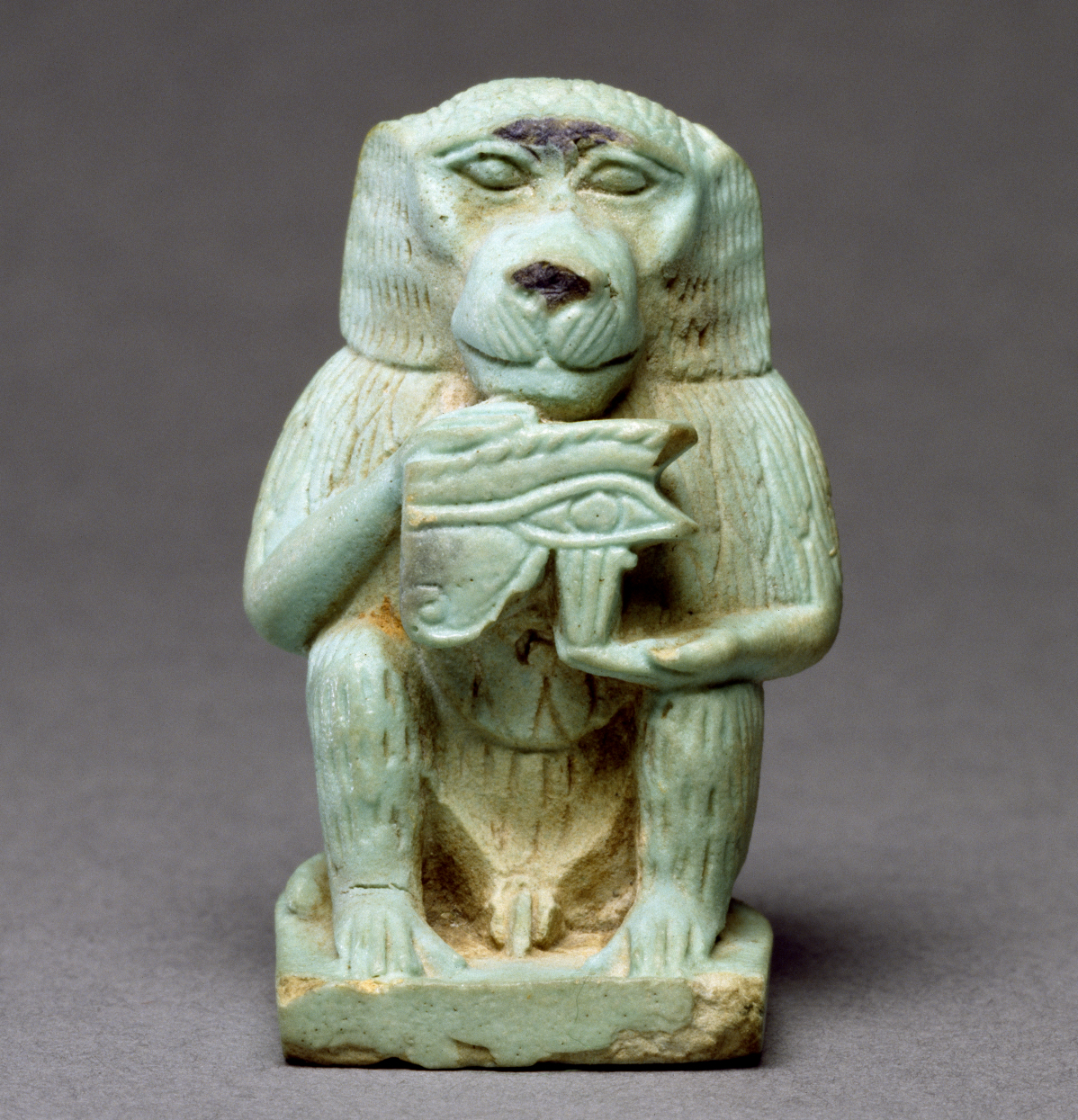
Amulet that depicts Thoth as a baboon holding the Eye of Horus; 664–332 BC; Egyptian faience with light green glaze; height: 3.9 cm, width: 2.4 cm, depth: 2.5 cm; Walters Art Museum (Baltimore, US)

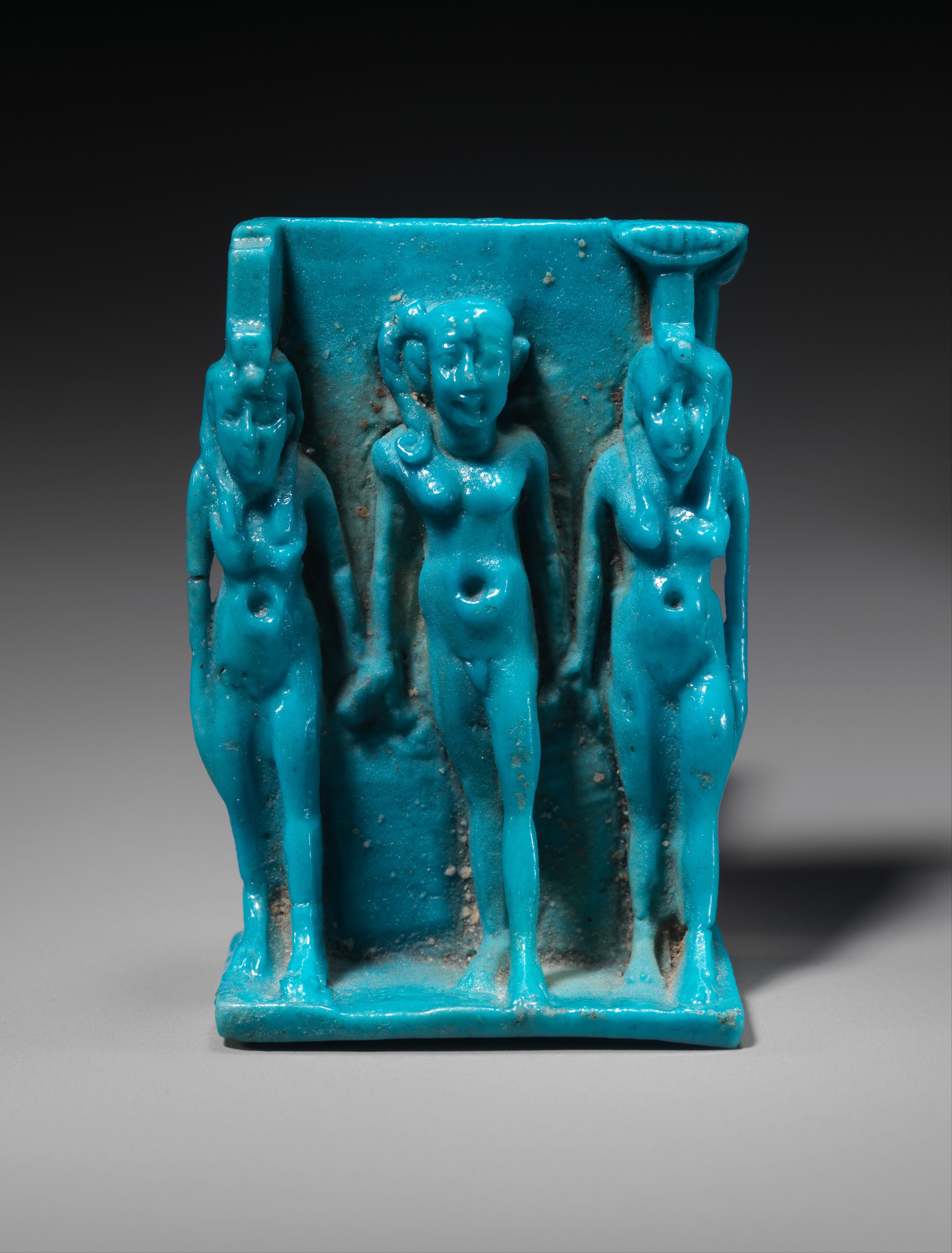
Amulet which depicts a triad of Isis, Horus and Nephthys; 664–332 BC; faience; height: 4.5 cm, width: 3 cm, depth: 2.2 cm; Metropolitan Museum of Art (New York City)

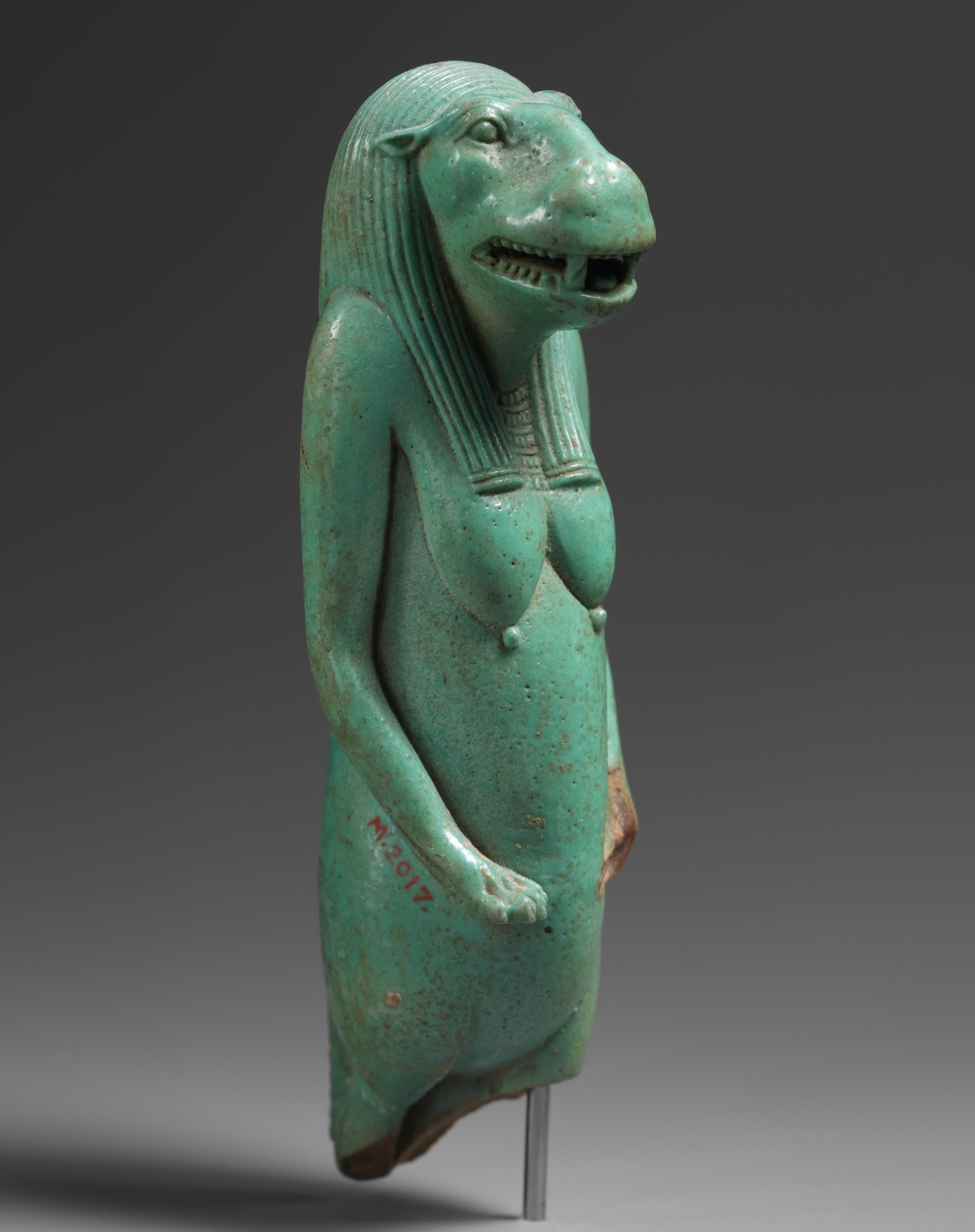
Amulet depicting Taweret; 664–332 BC; faience; height: 9.7 cm; Metropolitan Museum of Art

=== Scarab-shaped amulets ===
The protective amulet for the heart was in the form of the scarab beetle, the manifestation of the creator and solar deity Khepri. It was a symbol of new life and resurrection. The scarab beetle was seen to push a ball of dung along the ground, and from this came the idea of the beetle rolling the sun across the sky. Subsequently, the young beetles were observed to hatch from their eggs inside the ball, hence the idea of creation: life springs forth from primordial mud.

The heart scarab was a large scarab amulet which was wrapped in the mummy bandaging over the deceased's heart. It was made from a range of green and dark-colored materials, including faience, glass, glazed steatite, schist, feldspar, hematite and obsidian. Black was also associated with the afterlife, while blue and green were associated with the birth and the life-giving waters of the Nile.

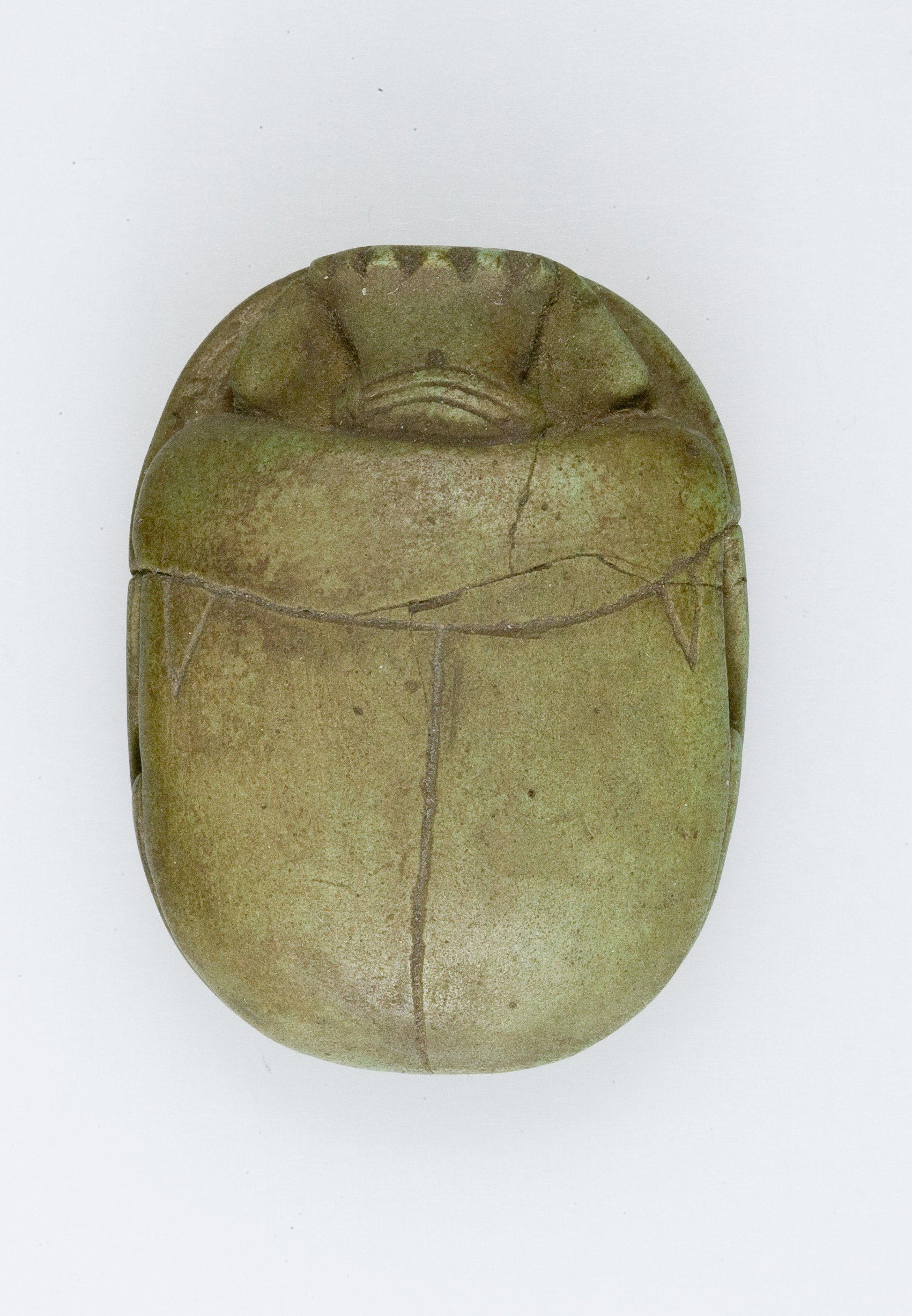
Heart scarab of the singer of Amun Iakai; 1550–1186 BC; glass; length: 4.8 cm, width: 3.5 cm, height: 1.5 cm; Metropolitan Museum of Art (New York City)

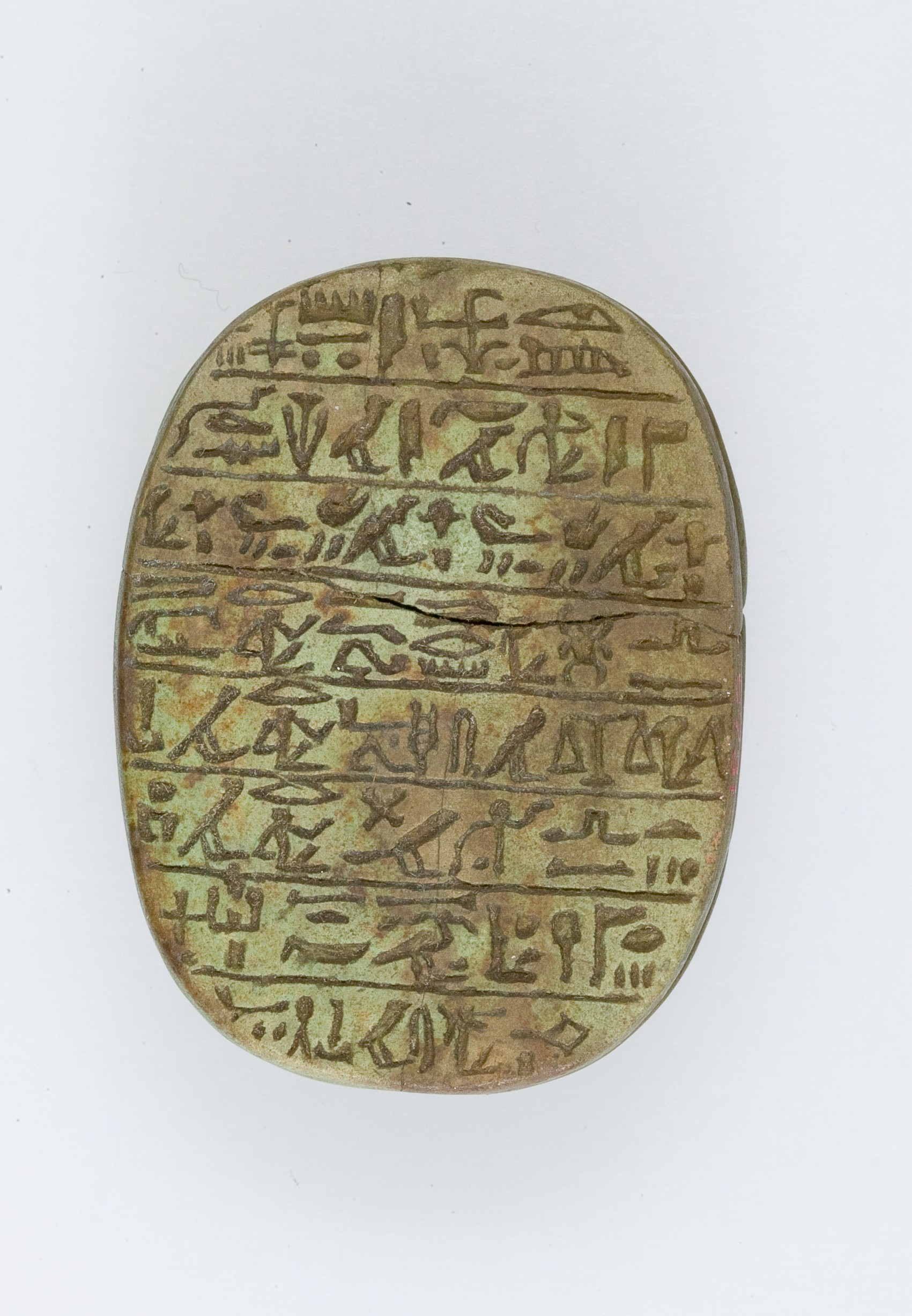
The back of a heart scarab of the singer of Amun Iakai; 1550–1186 BC; glass; length: 4.8 cm, width: 3.5 cm, height: 1.5 cm; Metropolitan Museum of Art

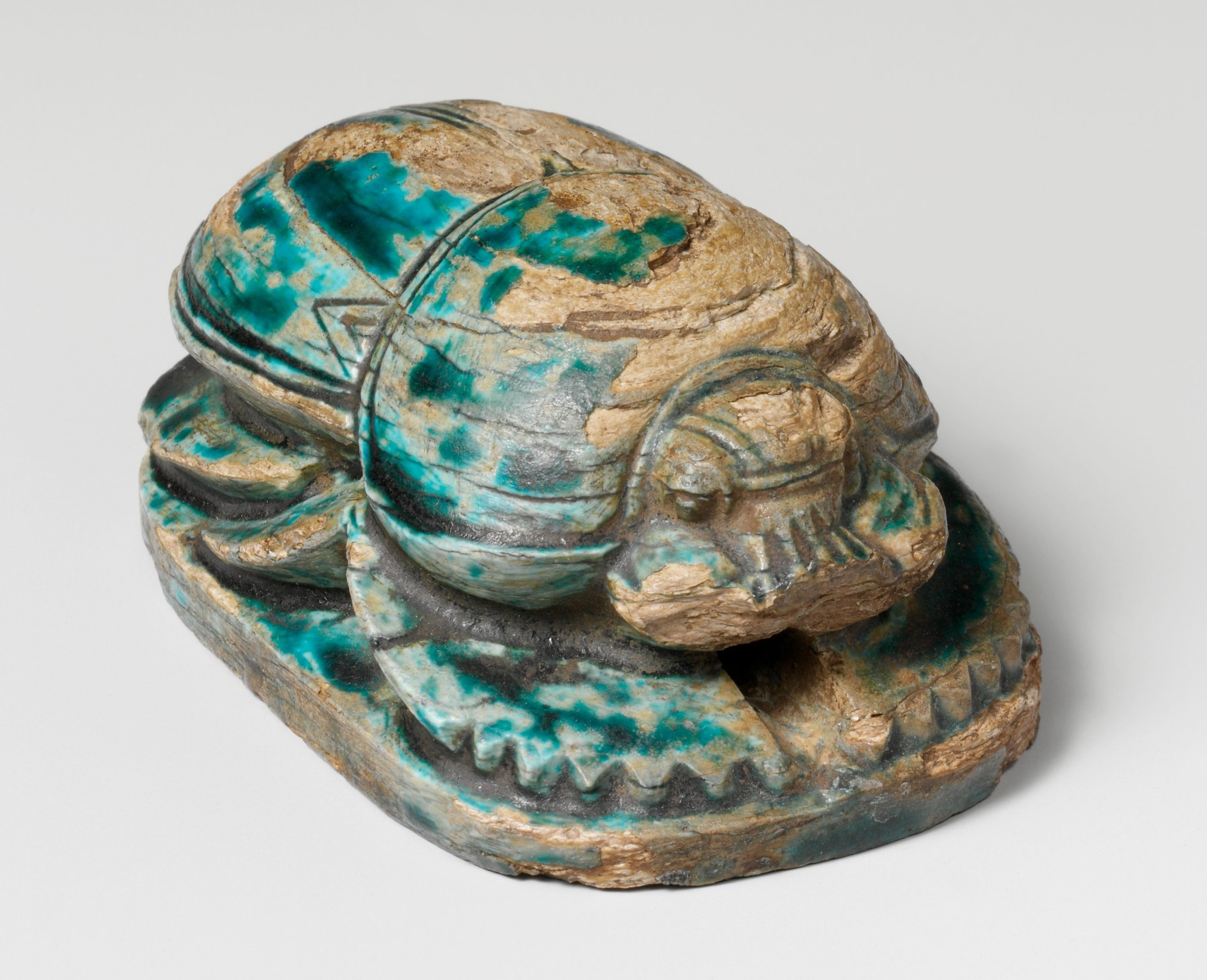
Commemorative scarab of Amenhotep III, recording a lion hunt; 1390–1352 BC; blue-glazed steatite; length: 8 cm; Metropolitan Museum of Art

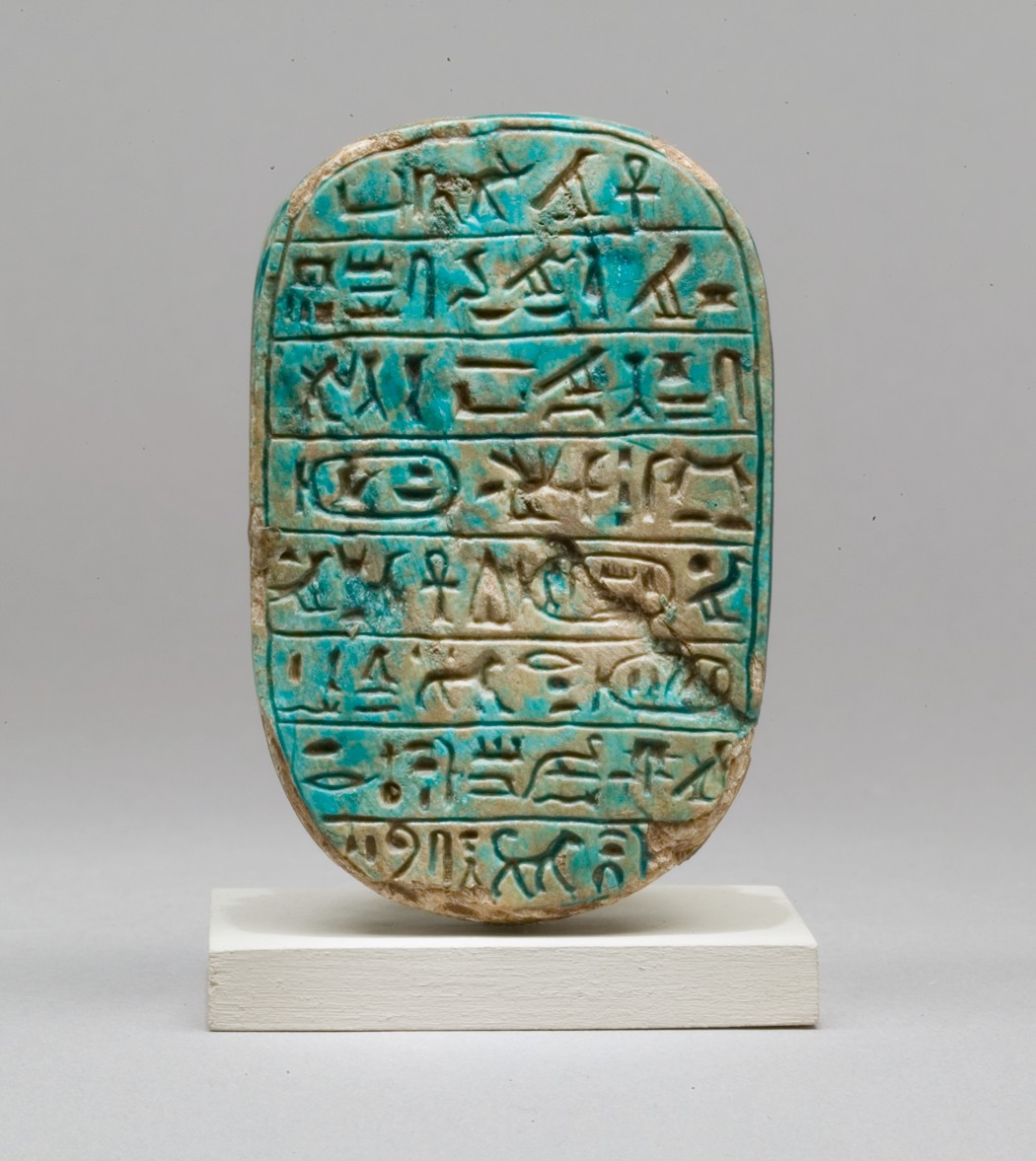
The back of a commemorative scarab of Amenhotep III, recording a lion hunt; 1390–1352 BC; blue glazed steatite; length: 8 cm; Metropolitan Museum of Art

== Pottery ==
Different types of pottery items were deposited in tombs of the dead. Some such pottery items represented interior parts of the body, such as the lungs, the liver and smaller intestines, which were removed before embalming. A large number of smaller objects in enamel pottery were also deposited with the dead. It was customary for the tomb walls to be crafted with cones of pottery, about 15 to 25 cm (6 to 10 in) tall, on which were engraved or impressed legends relating to the dead occupants of the tombs. These cones usually contained the names of the deceased, their titles, offices which they held, and some expressions appropriate to funeral purposes.

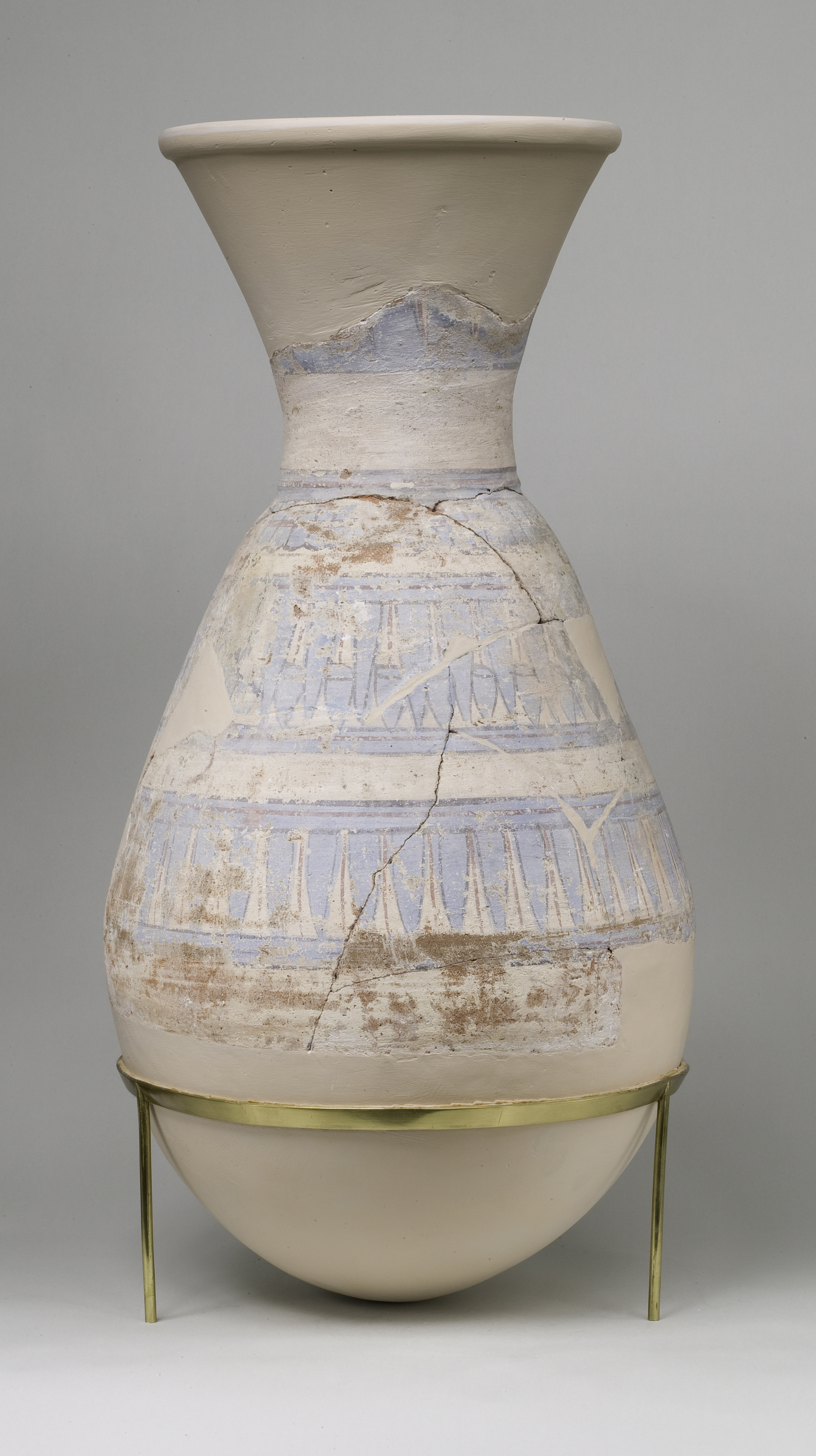
Blue-painted jar from Malqata; 1390–1353 BC; painted pottery; height: 69 cm; Metropolitan Museum of Art (New York City)

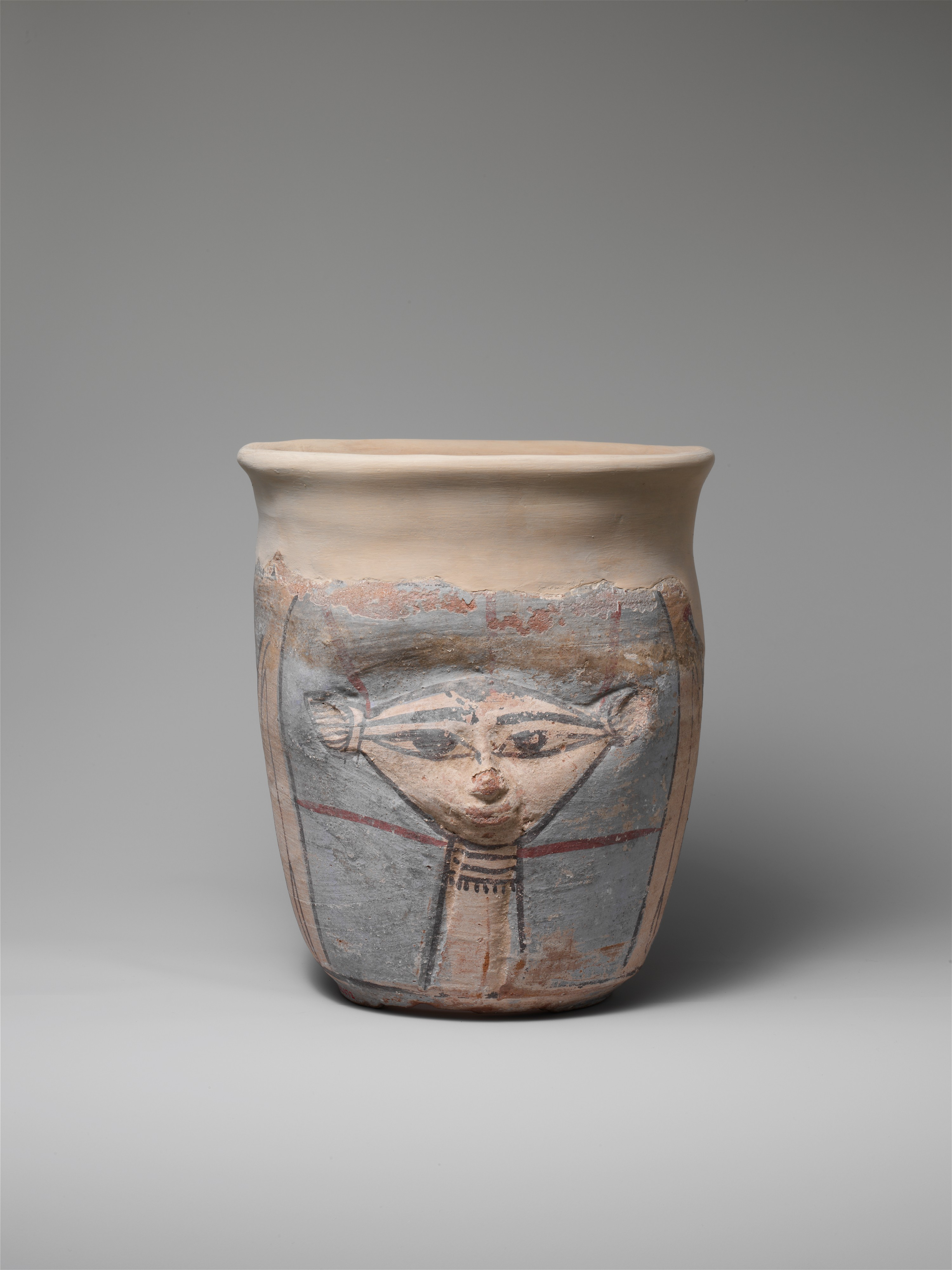
Hathor-shaped jar; 1390–1353 BC; painted pottery; height: 24.5 cm; Metropolitan Museum of Art

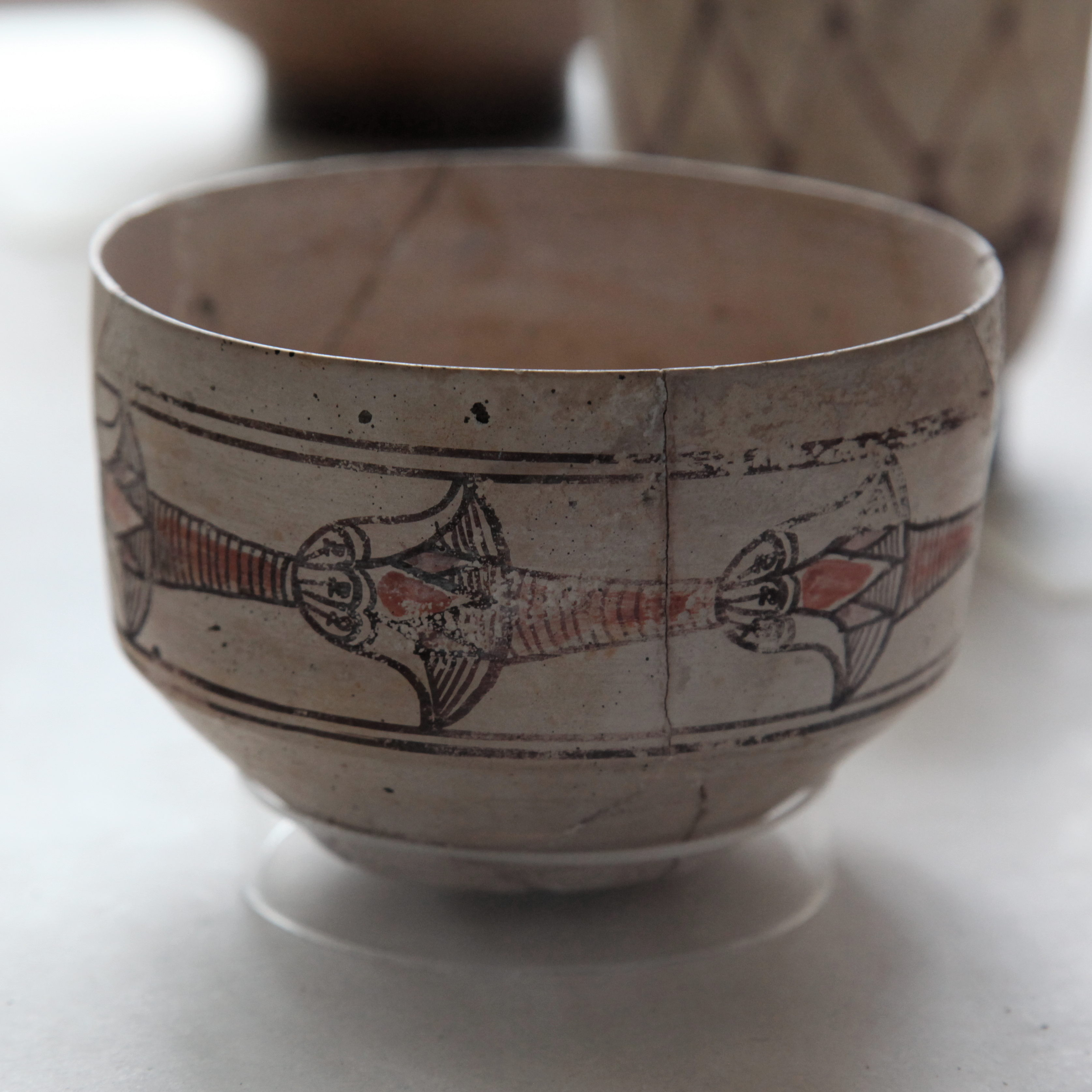
Cup ornated with papyrus flowers; 653–640 BC; terracotta; Louvre

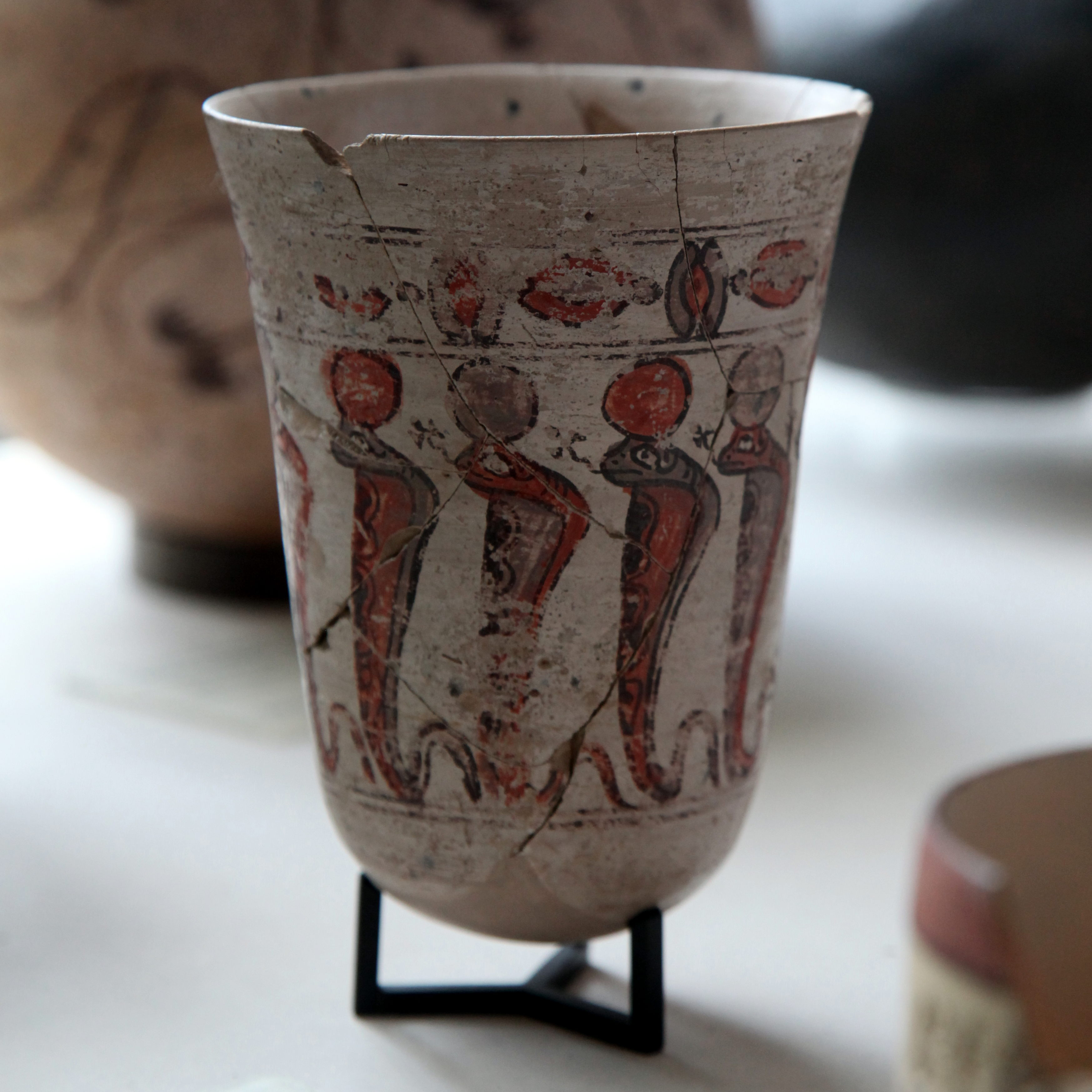
Goblet ornated with uraeuses; 653–640 BC; terracotta; Louvre

== Calligraphy ==
Egyptian writing remained a remarkably conservative system, and the preserve of a tiny literate minority, while the spoken language underwent considerable change. Egyptian stelas are decorated with finely carved hieroglyphs.

The use of hieroglyphic writing arose from proto-literate symbol systems in the Early Bronze Age, around the 32nd century BC (Naqada III), with the first decipherable sentence written in the Egyptian language dating to the Second Dynasty (28th century BC). Egyptian hieroglyphs developed into a mature writing system used for monumental inscription in the classical language of the Middle Kingdom period; during this period, the system made use of about 900 distinct signs. The use of this writing system continued through the New Kingdom and Late Period, and on into the Persian and Ptolemaic periods. Late use of hieroglyphics are found in the Roman period, extending into the 4th century AD.

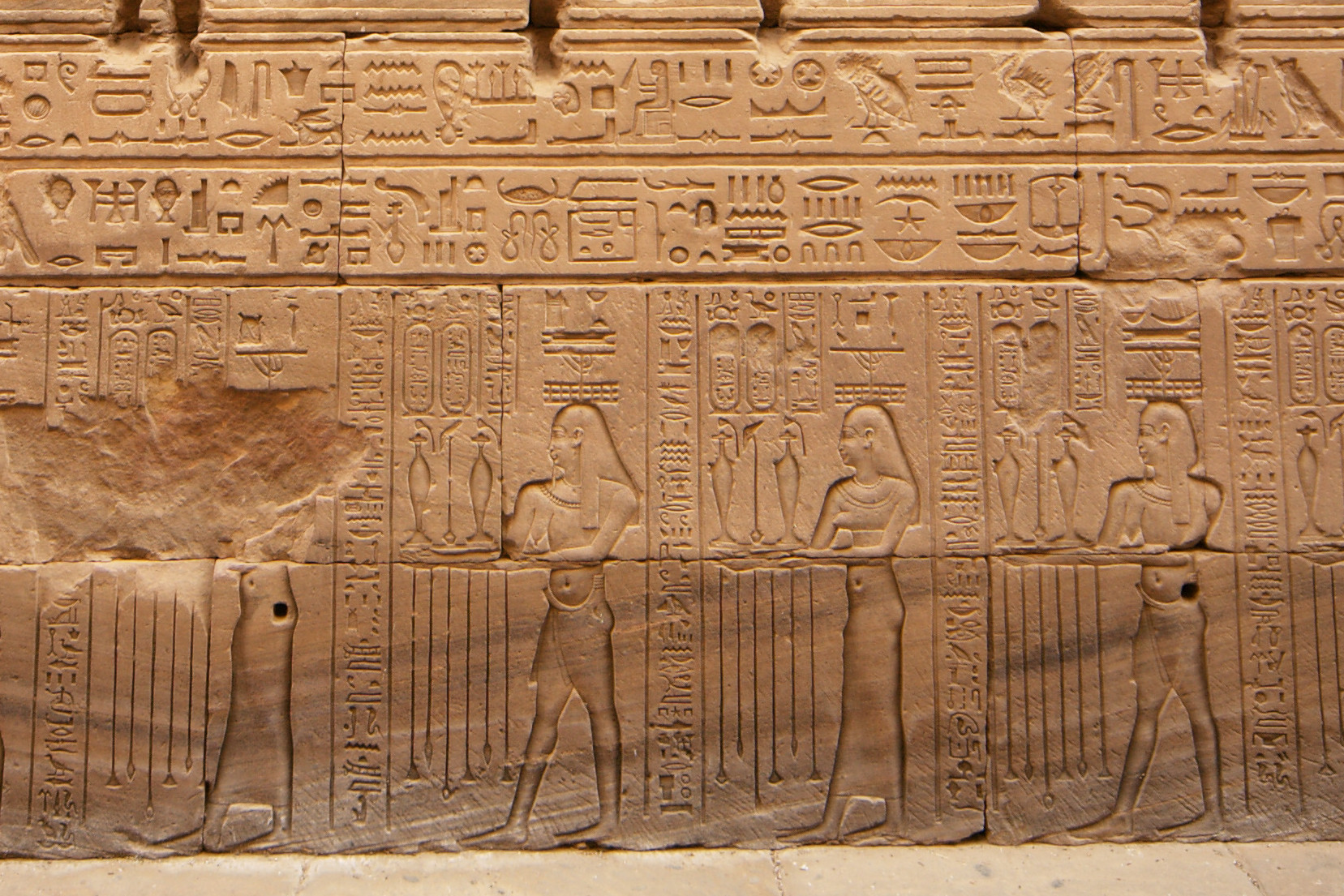
Relief with hieroglyphs from the Edfu Temple (Edfu, Egypt)

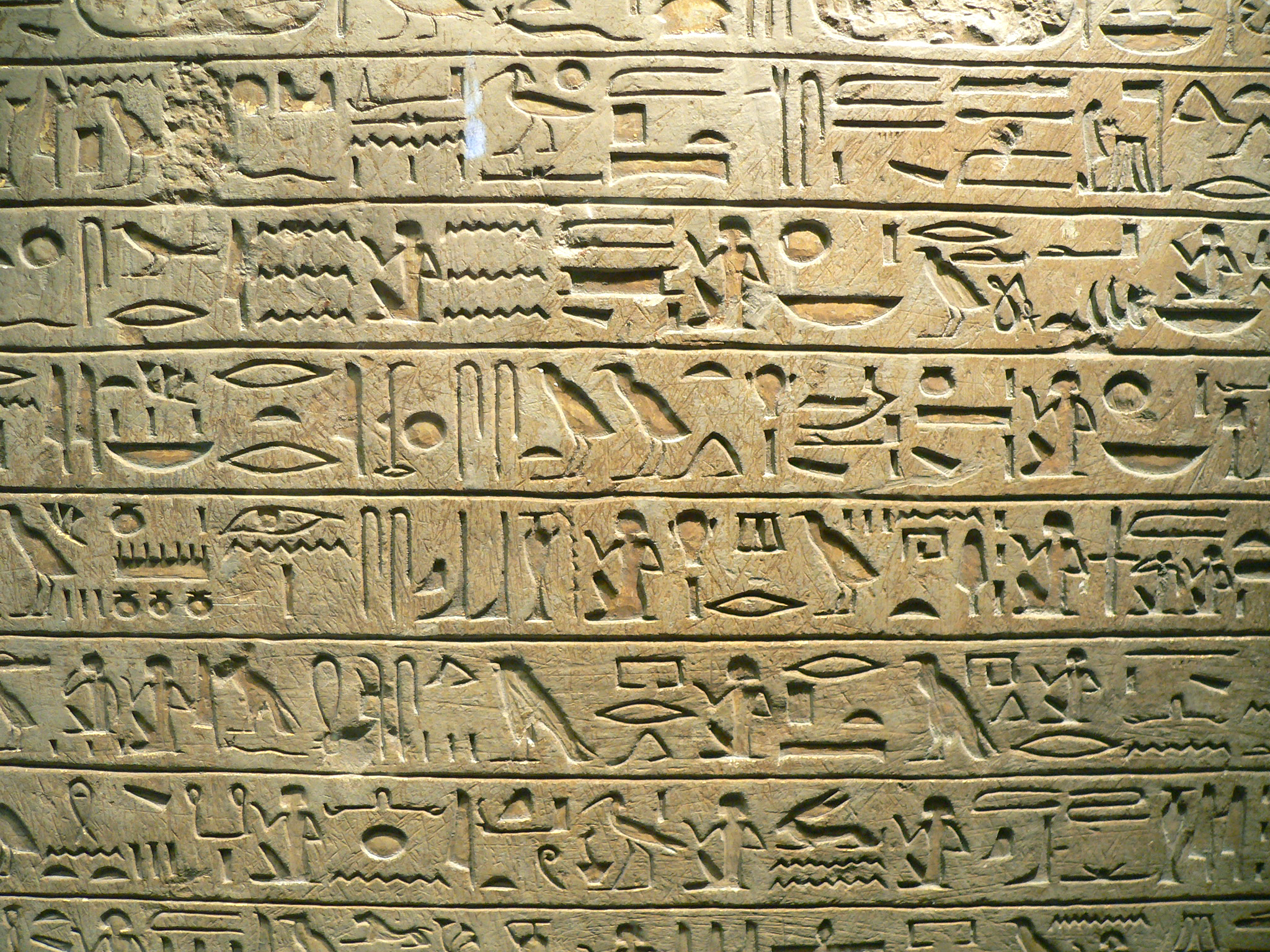
Hieroglyphs on the Stele Minnakht from c. 1321 BC, in the Louvre

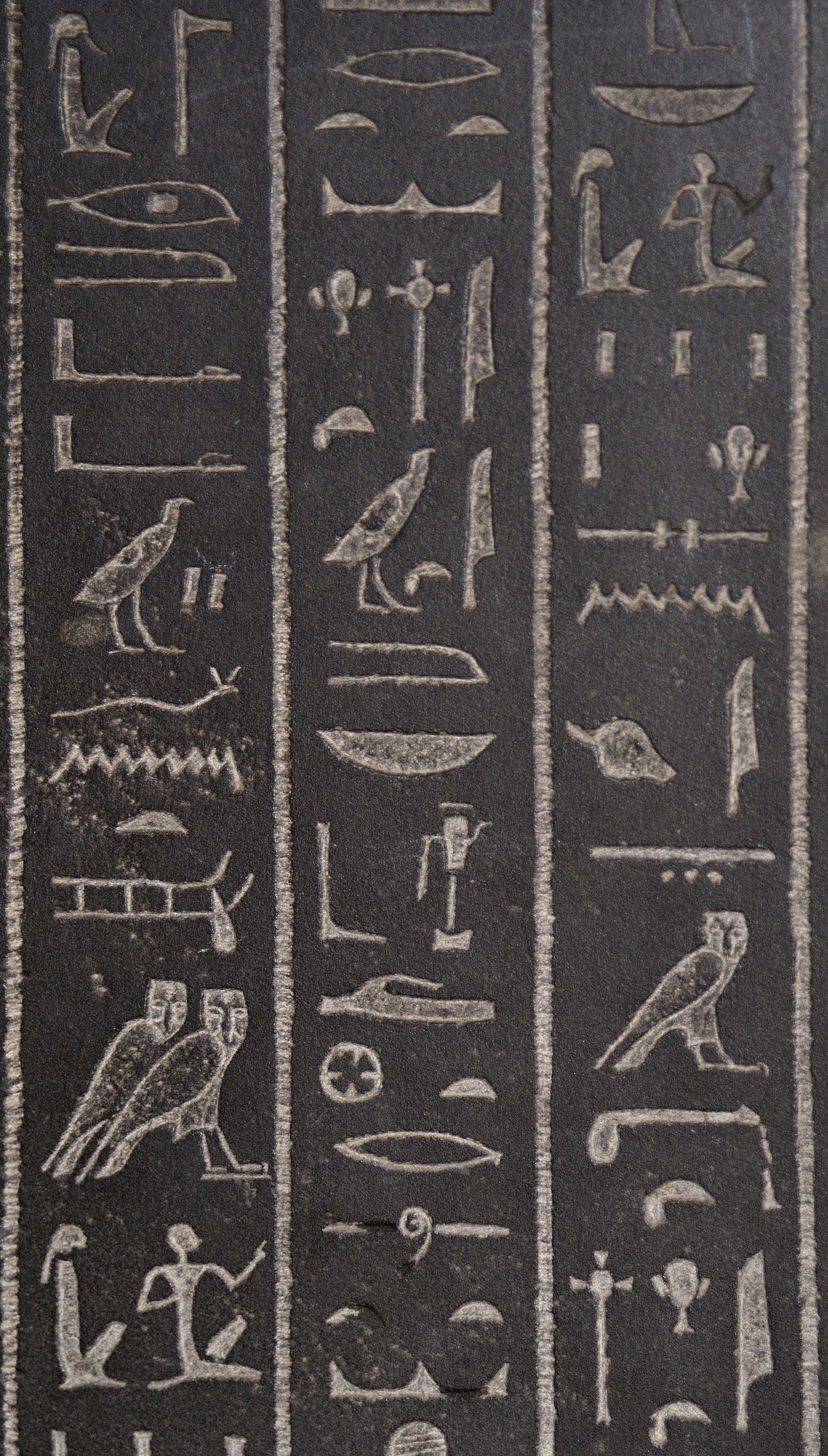
Detail from the side of a sarcophagus, circa 530 BC, in the British Museum (London)

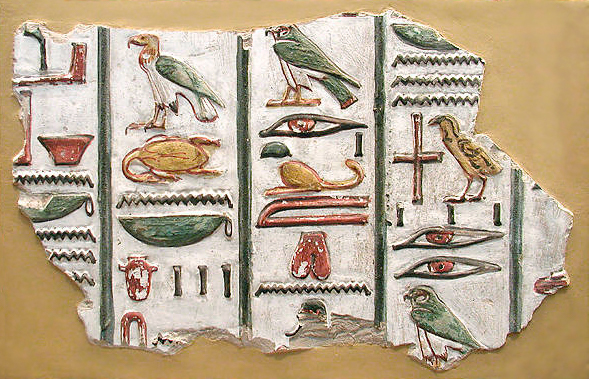
Hieroglyphs from the tomb of Seti I

== Furniture ==
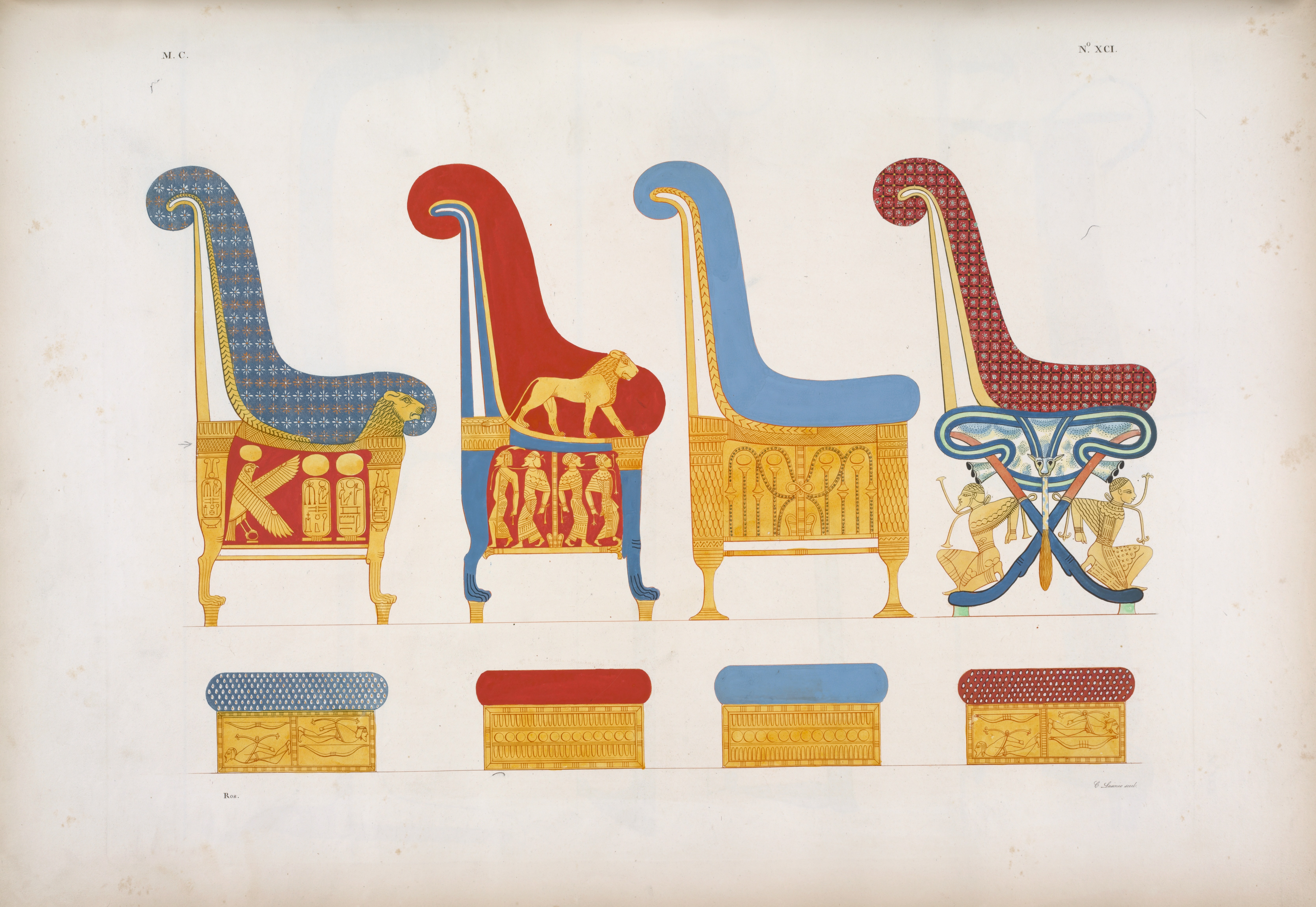
Illustrations of four royal chairs with their supporters

Although, by modern standards, ancient Egyptian houses would have been very sparsely furnished, woodworking and cabinet-making were highly developed crafts. All the main types of furniture are attested, either as surviving examples or in tomb decoration. Chairs were only for the wealthy; most people would have used low stools. Beds consisted of a wooden frame, with matting or leather webbing to provide support; the most elaborate beds also had a canopy, hung with netting, to provide extra privacy and protection from insects. The feet of chairs, stools and beds were often modeled to resemble bull hooves or, in later periods, lion feet or duck heads. Wooden furniture was often coated with a layer of plaster and painted.

Royal furniture was more elaborate, making use of inlays, veneers and marquetry. Funerary objects from the tomb of Tutankhamun include tables, boxes and chests, a gilded throne, and ritual beds shaped like elongated hippos and cattle. The burial equipment of Hetepheres included a set of travelling furniture, light and easy to dismantle. Such furniture must have been used on military campaigns and other royal journeys. Egyptian furniture has highly influenced the development of Greco-Roman furniture. It also was one of the principal sources of inspiration of a style known as Empire. The main motifs used are: palm and lotus leaves, flowers, lion heads and claws, bull hooves, bird heads, and geometric combinations. Everything is sober and with a monumental character.

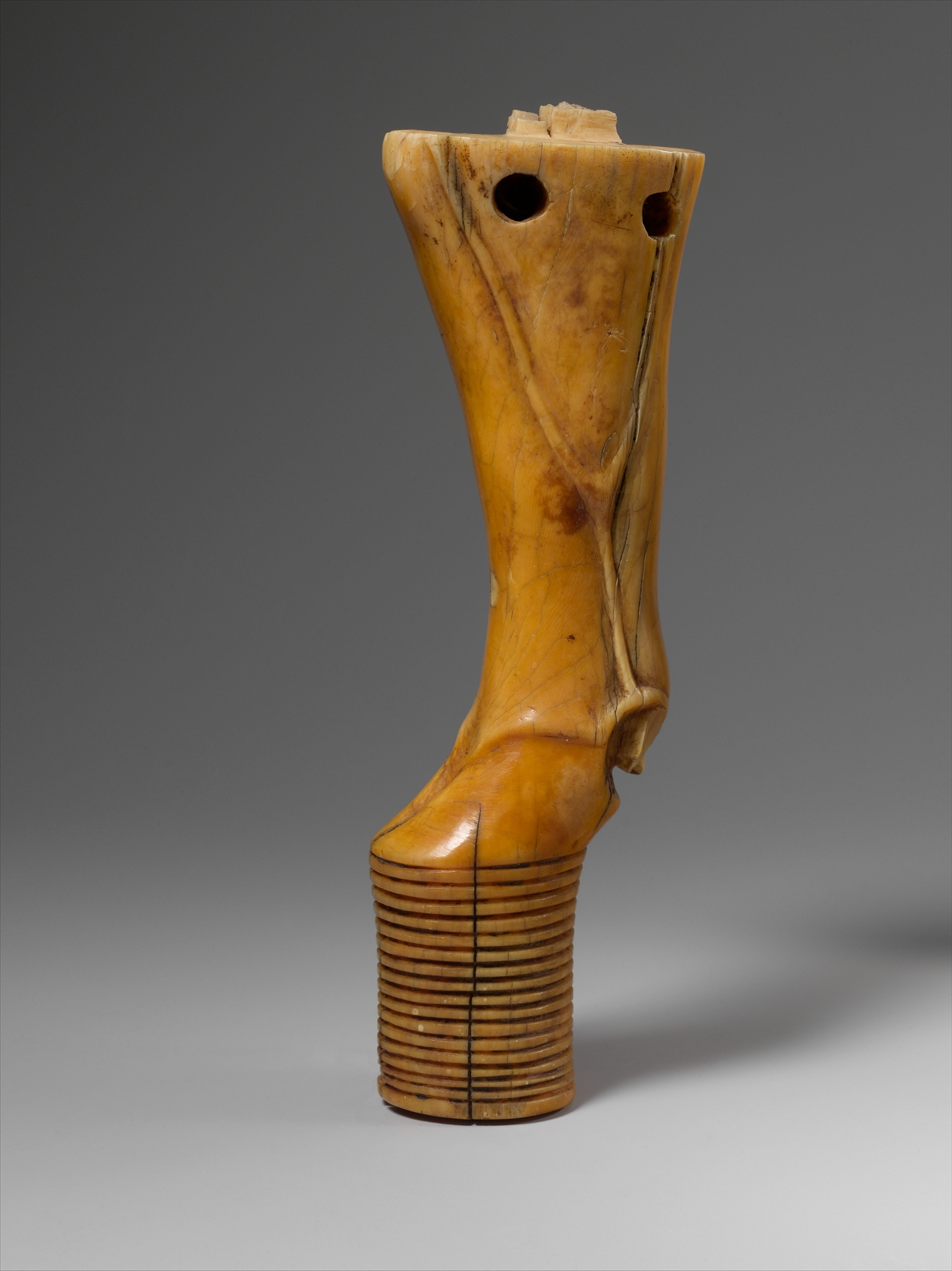
Furniture leg in shape of bull's leg; 2960–2770 BC; hippopotamus ivory; height: 17 cm, width: 3.4 cm, depth: 5.8 cm; Metropolitan Museum of Art (New York City)

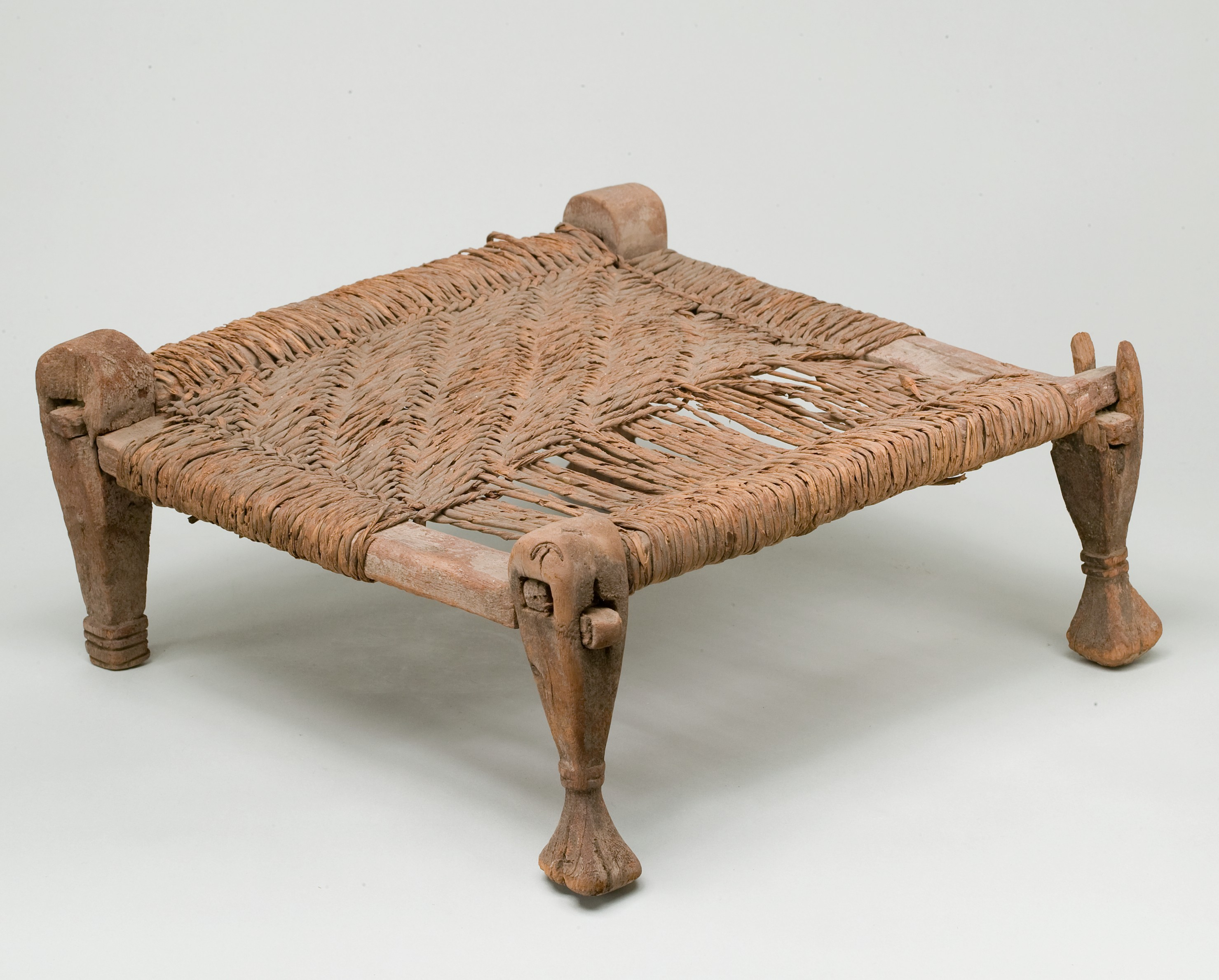
Stool with woven seat; 1991–1450 BC; wood & reed; height: 13 cm; Metropolitan Museum of Art

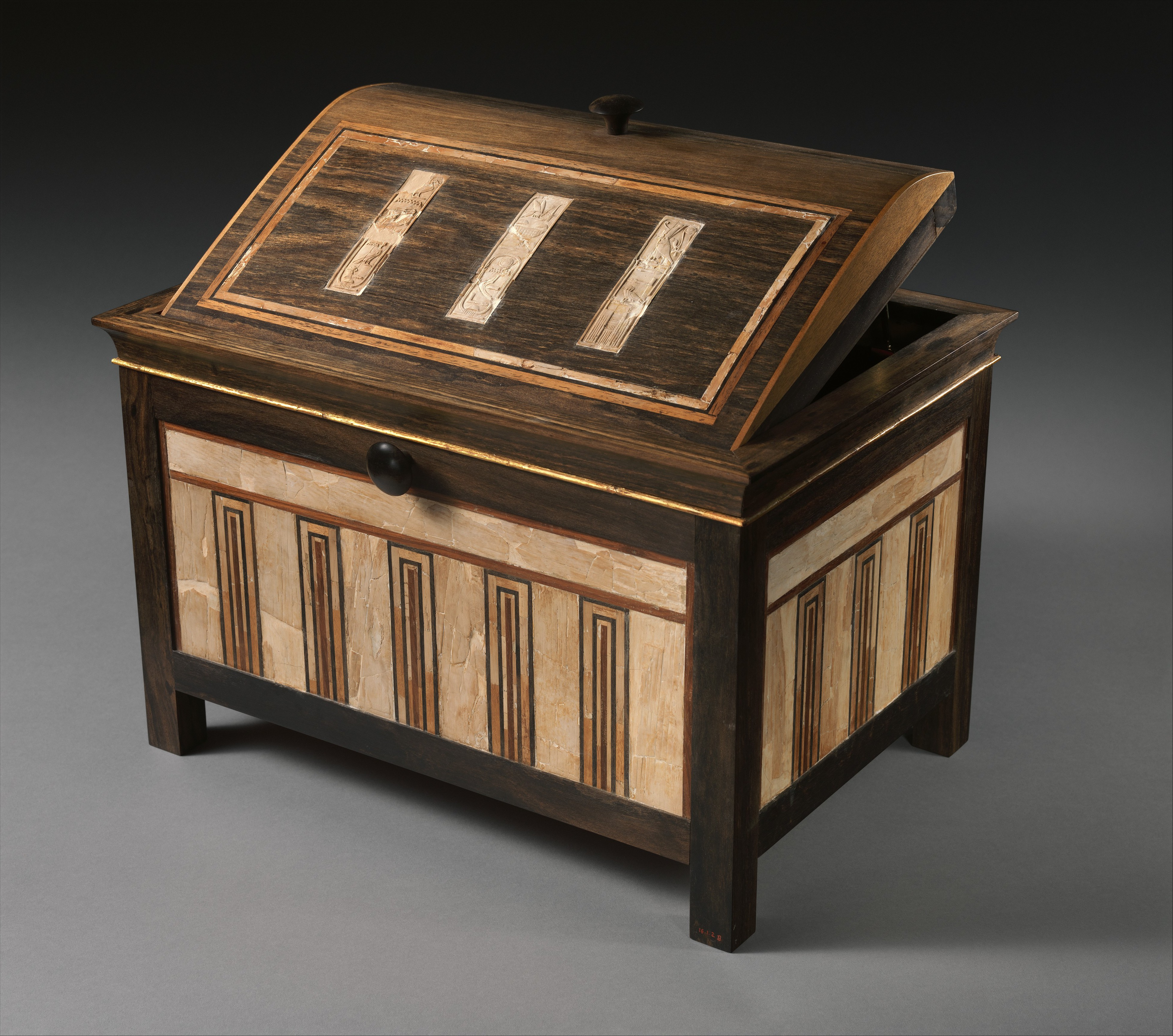
Inlaid box for cosmetic vessels of Sithathoryunet; 1887–1813 BC; ebony, inlaid with ivory and red wood (restored) and gold trim; height: 25.2 cm, length: 36.4 cm, depth: 25.2 cm; Metropolitan Museum of Art

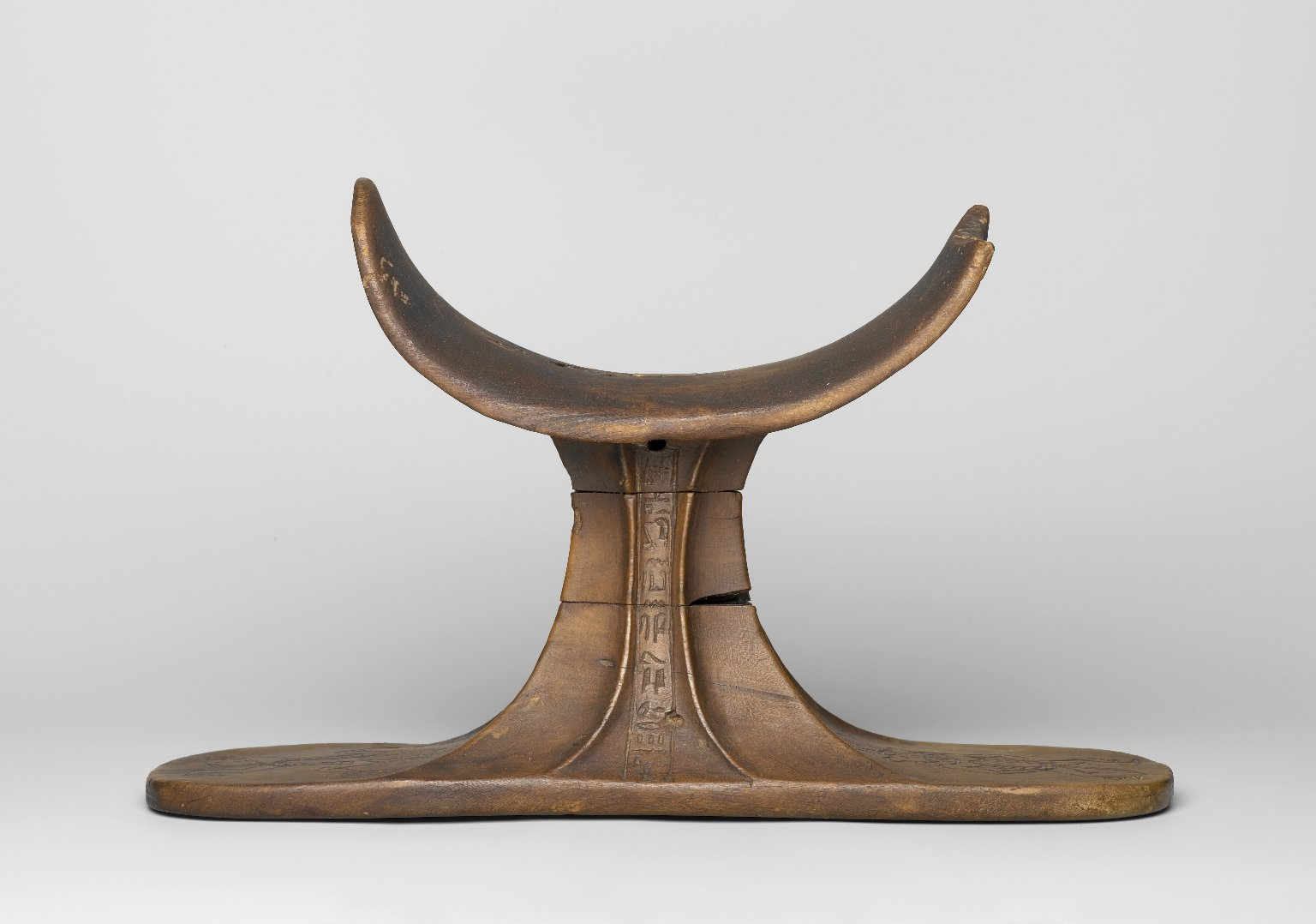
Headrest; 1539–1190 BC; wood; 17.8 x 28.6 x 7.6 cm; Brooklyn Museum (New York City)

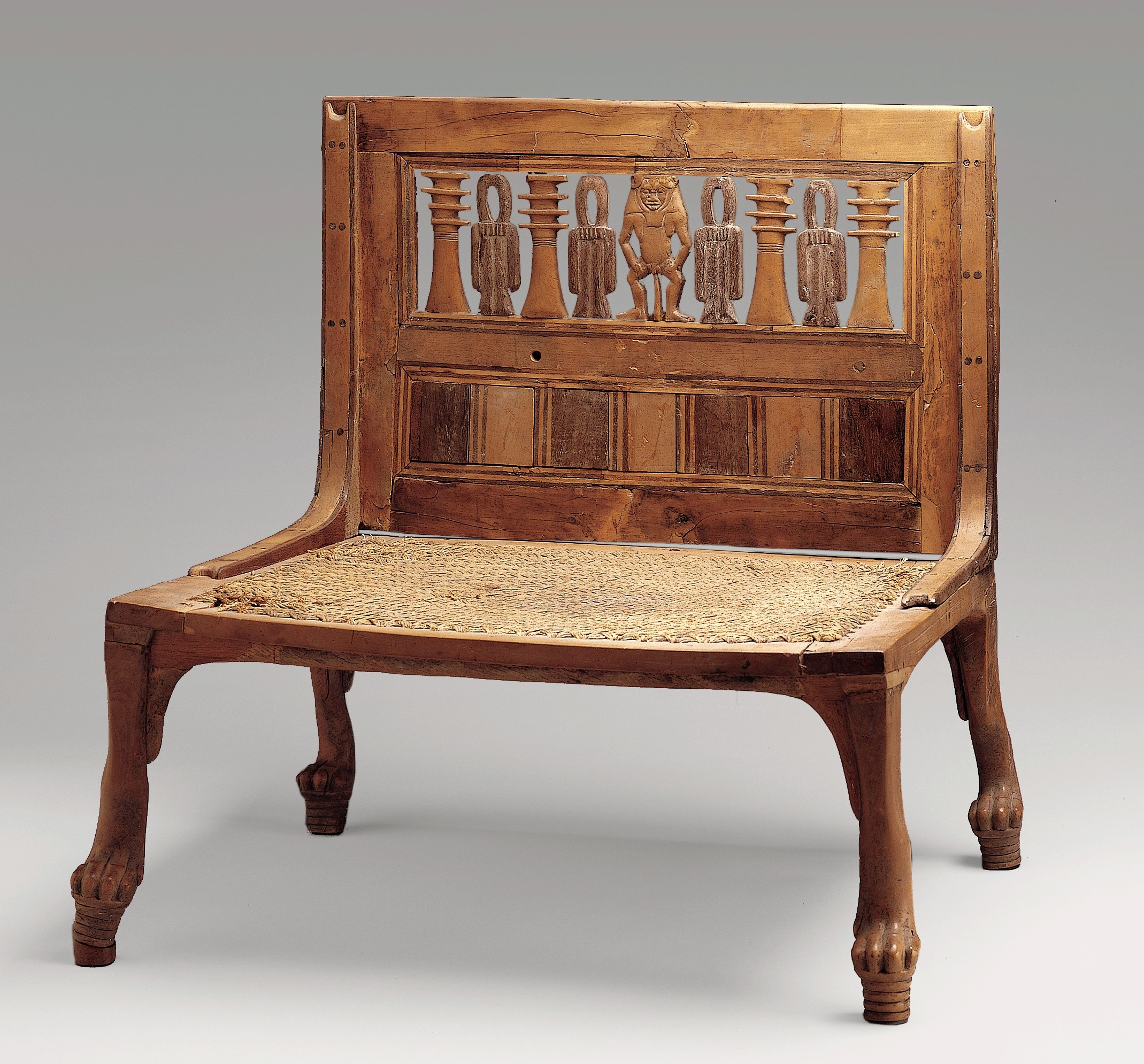
Chair of Hatnefer; 1492–1473 BC; boxwood, cypress, ebony & linen cord; height: 53 cm; Metropolitan Museum of Art

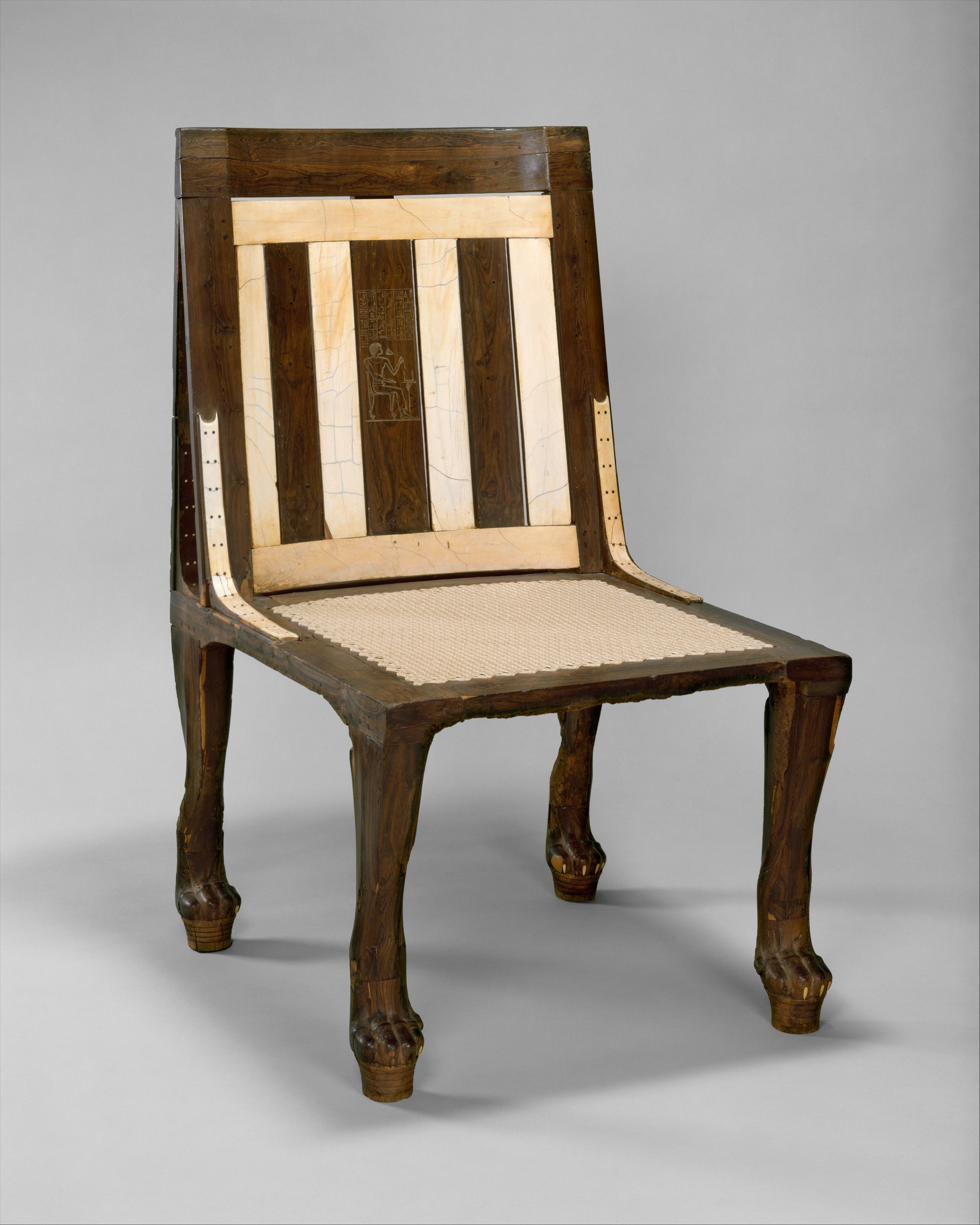
Chair of Reniseneb; 1450 BC; wood, ebony & ivory; height: 86.2 cm; Metropolitan Museum of Art

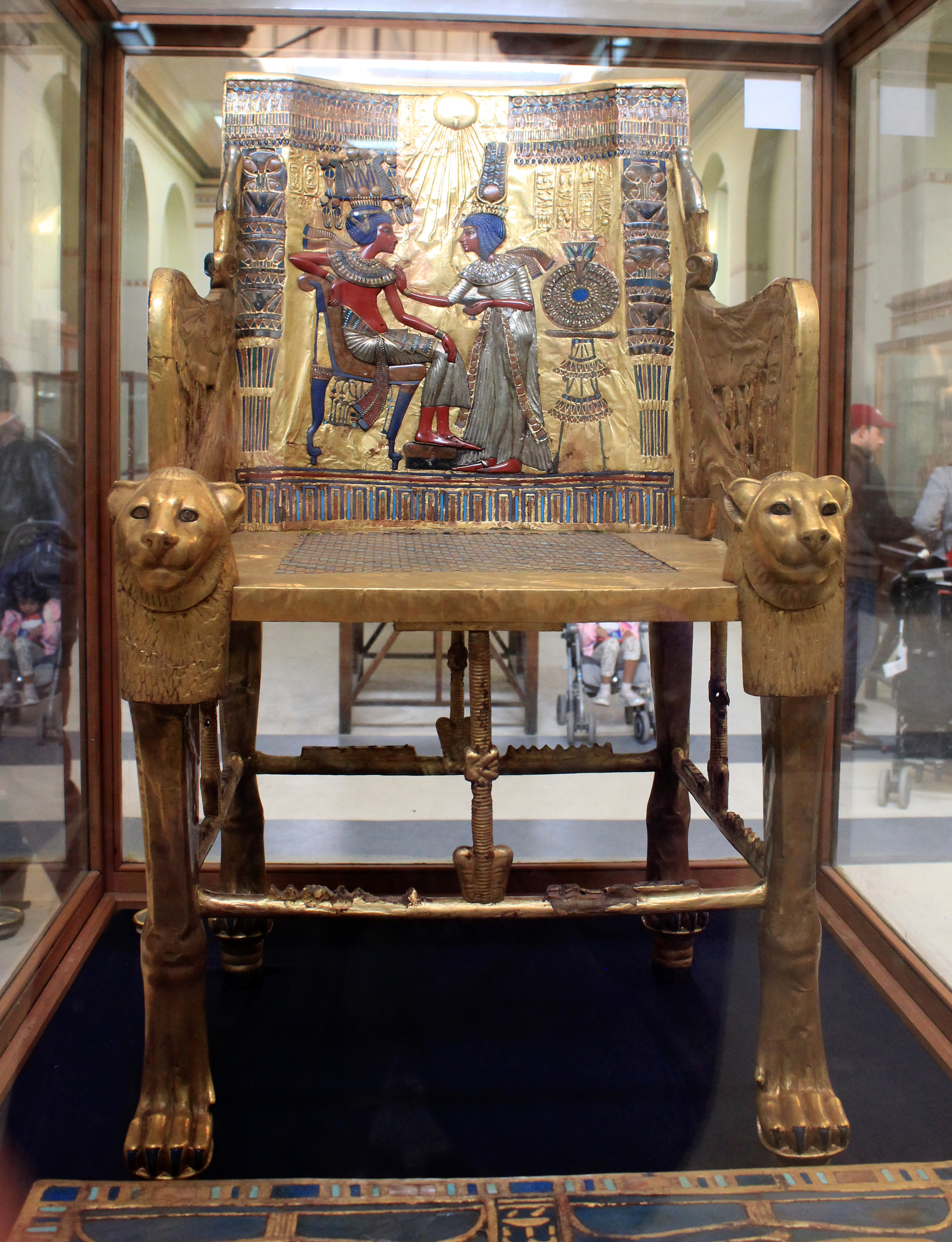
The Throne of Tutankhamun; 1336–1327 BC; wood covered with sheets of gold, silver, semi-precious and other stones, faience, glass and bronze; height: 1 m; Egyptian Museum (Cairo)

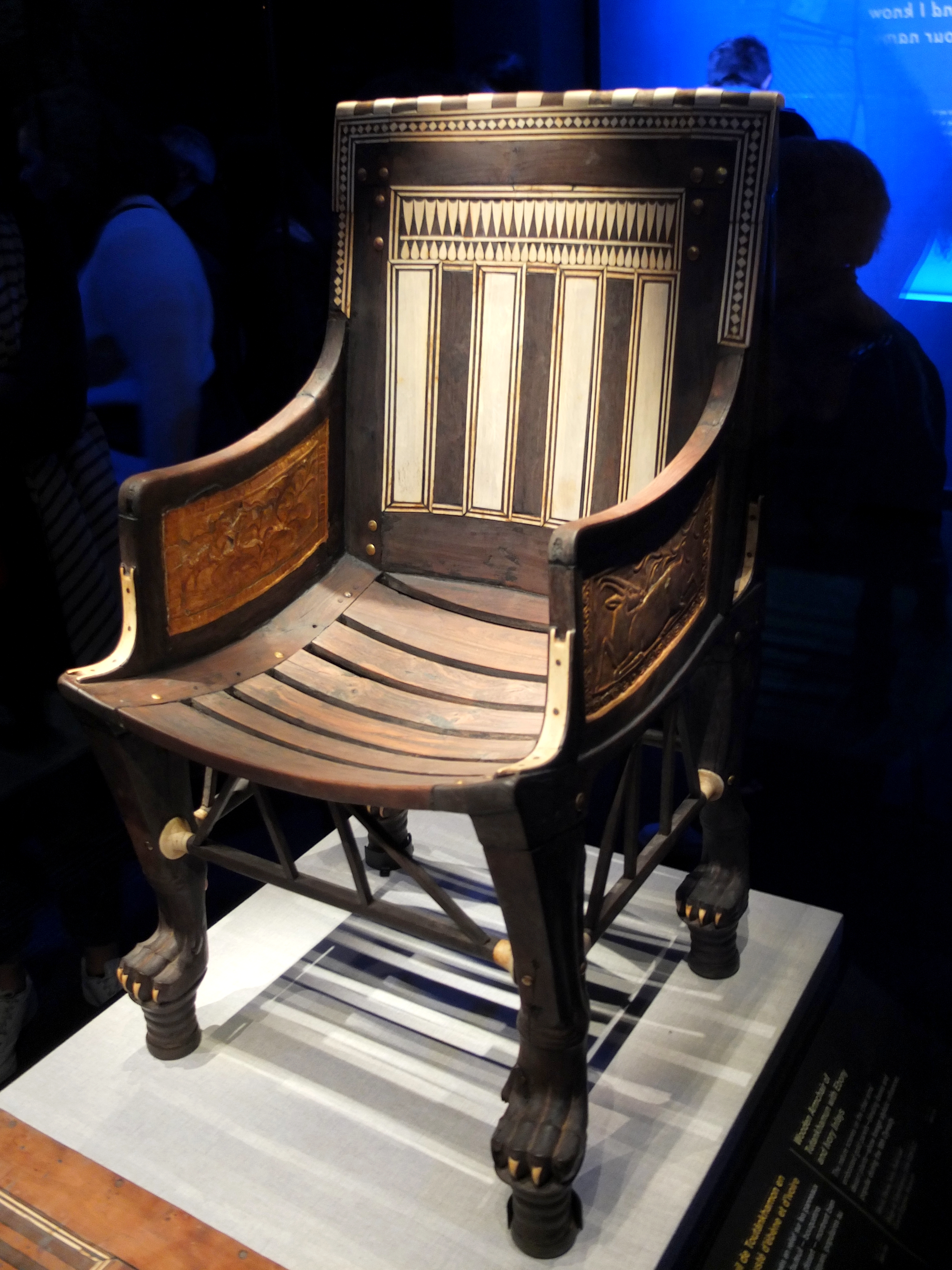
Armchair of Tutankhamun; 1336–1326 BC; wood, ebony, ivory and gold leaf; height: 71 cm; Exposition of Tutankhamun Treasure in Paris (2019)

== Clothing ==
Artistic representations, supplemented by surviving garments, are the main sources of evidence for ancient Egyptian fashion. The two sources are not always in agreement, however, and it seems that representations were more concerned with highlighting certain attributes of the person depicted than with accurately recordings their true appearance. For example, women were often shown with restrictive, tight-fitting dresses, perhaps to emphasize their figures.

As in most societies, fashions in Egypt changed over time; different clothes were worn in different seasons of the year, and by different sections of society. Particular office-holders, especially priests and the king, had their own special garments.

For the general population, clothing was simple, predominantly of linen, and probably white or off-white in color. It would have shown the dirt easily, and professional launderers are known to have been attached to the New Kingdom workmen's village at Deir el-Medina. Men would have worn a simple loin-cloth or short kilt (known as shendyt), supplemented in winter by a heavier tunic. High-status individuals could express their status through their clothing, and were more susceptible to changes in fashion.

Longer, more voluminous clothing made an appearance in the Middle Kingdom; flowing, elaborately pleated, diaphanous robes for men and women were particularly popular in the late 18th Dynasty and the Ramesside period. Decorated textiles also became more common in the New Kingdom. In all periods, women's dresses may have been enhanced by colorful bead netting worn over the top. In the Roman Period, Egypt became known for the manufacture of fine clothing. Coiled sewn sandals or sandals of leather are the most commonly attested types of footwear. Examples of these, together with linen shirts and other clothing, were discovered in the tomb of Tutankhamun.

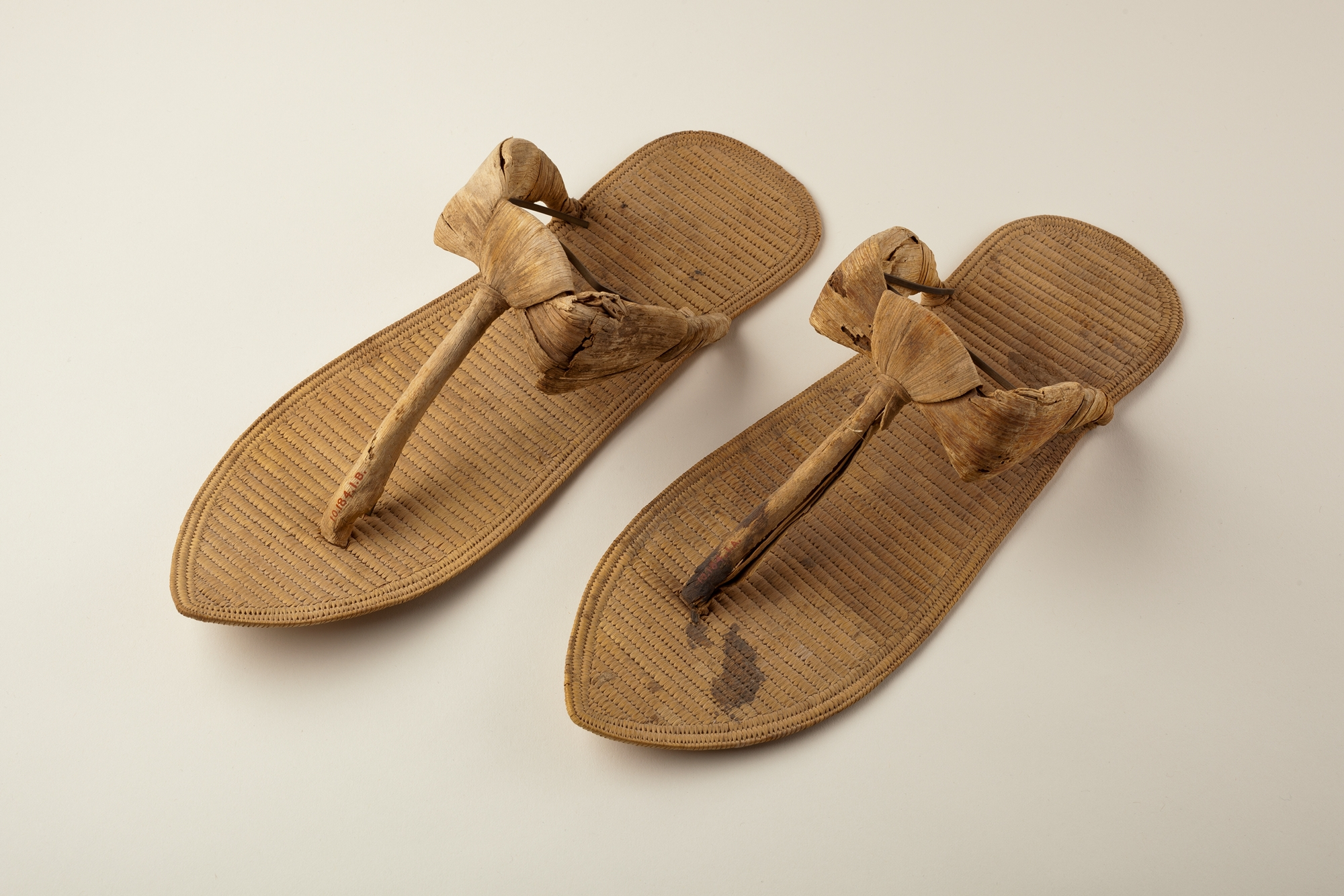
Pair of sandals; 1390–1352 BC; grass, reed and papyrus; Metropolitan Museum of Art (New York City)

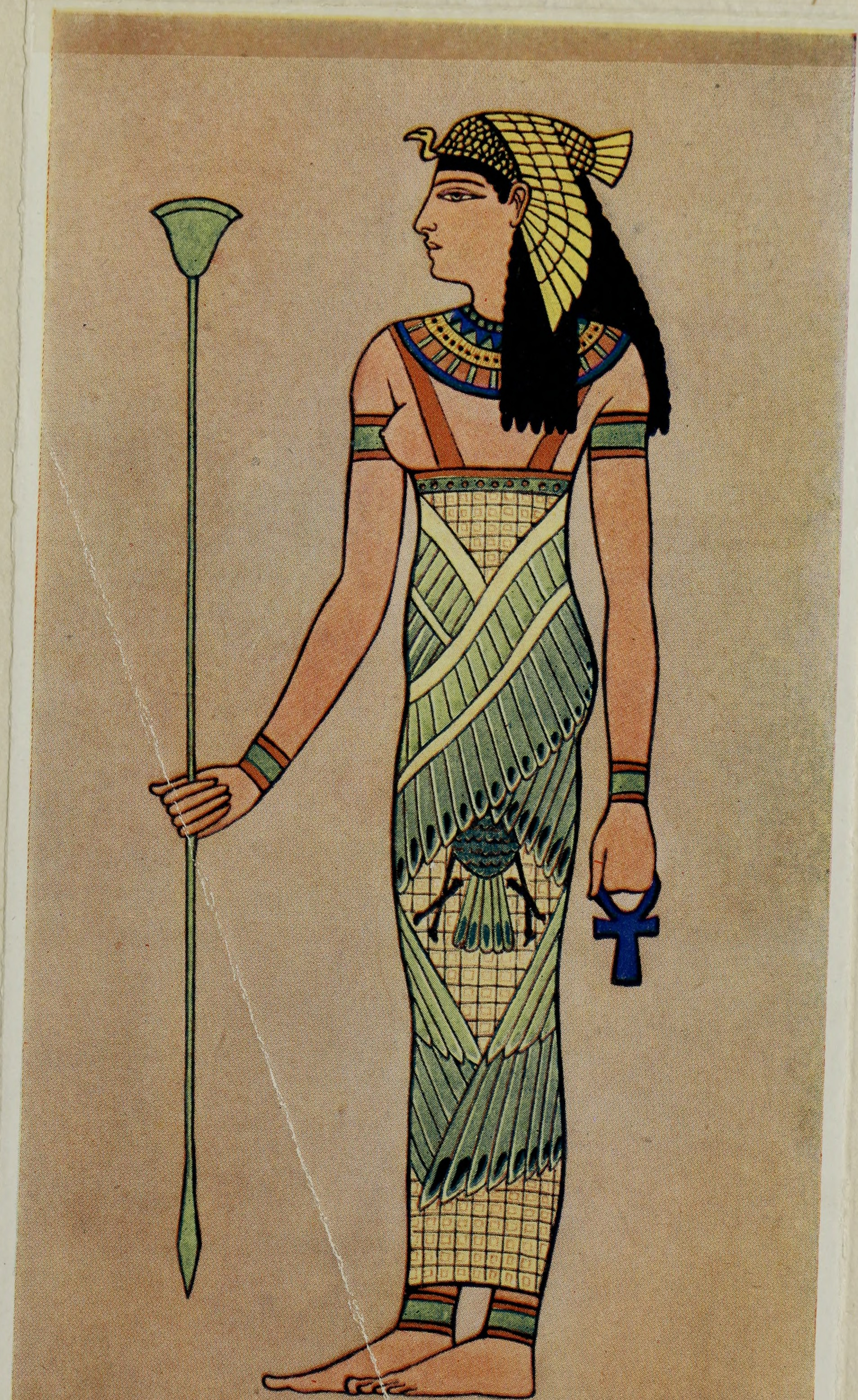
Illustration from the book Ancient Egyptian, Assyrian, and Persian costumes and decorations

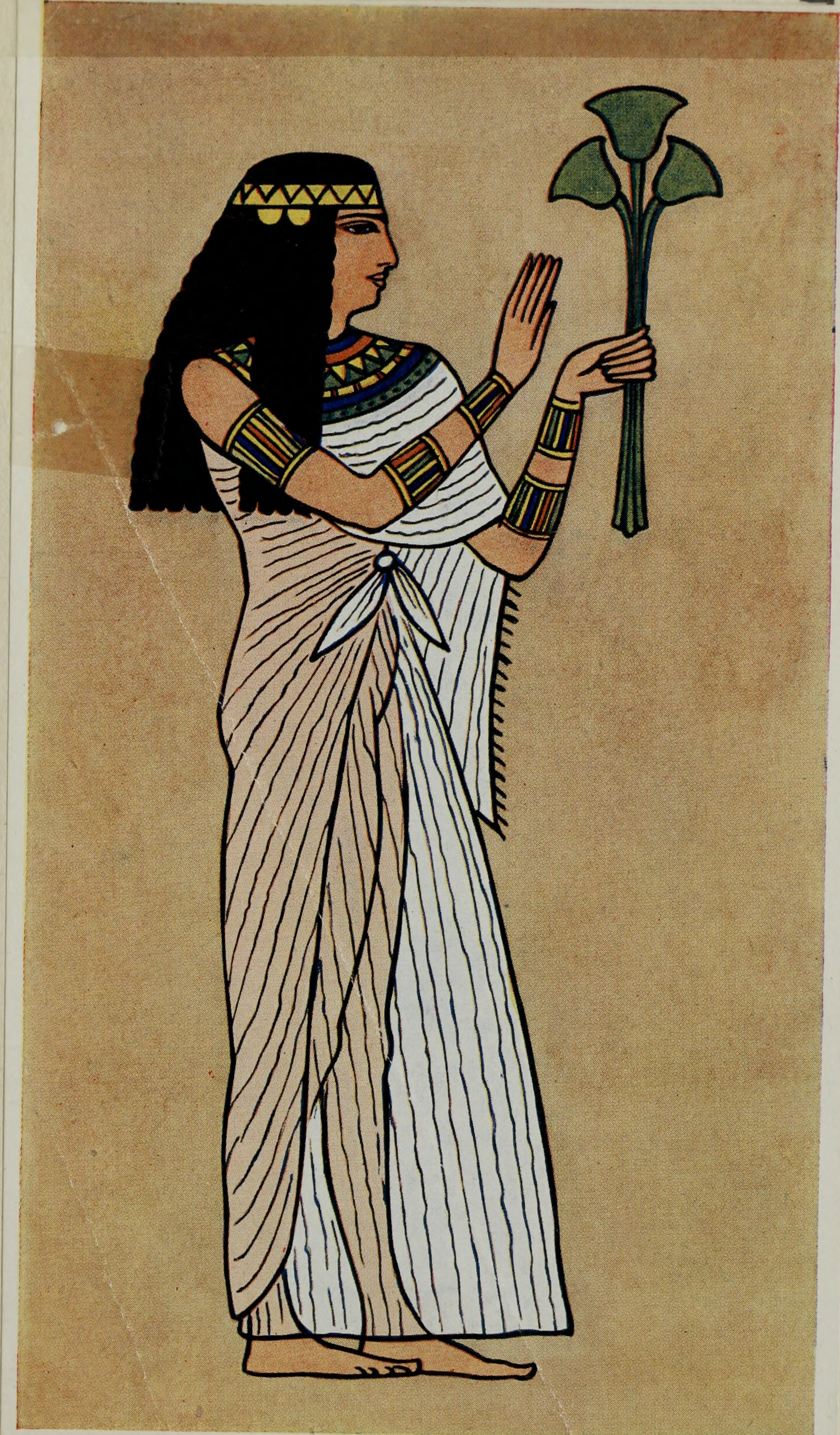
Illustration of a goddess from Ancient Egyptian, Assyrian, and Persian costumes and decorations

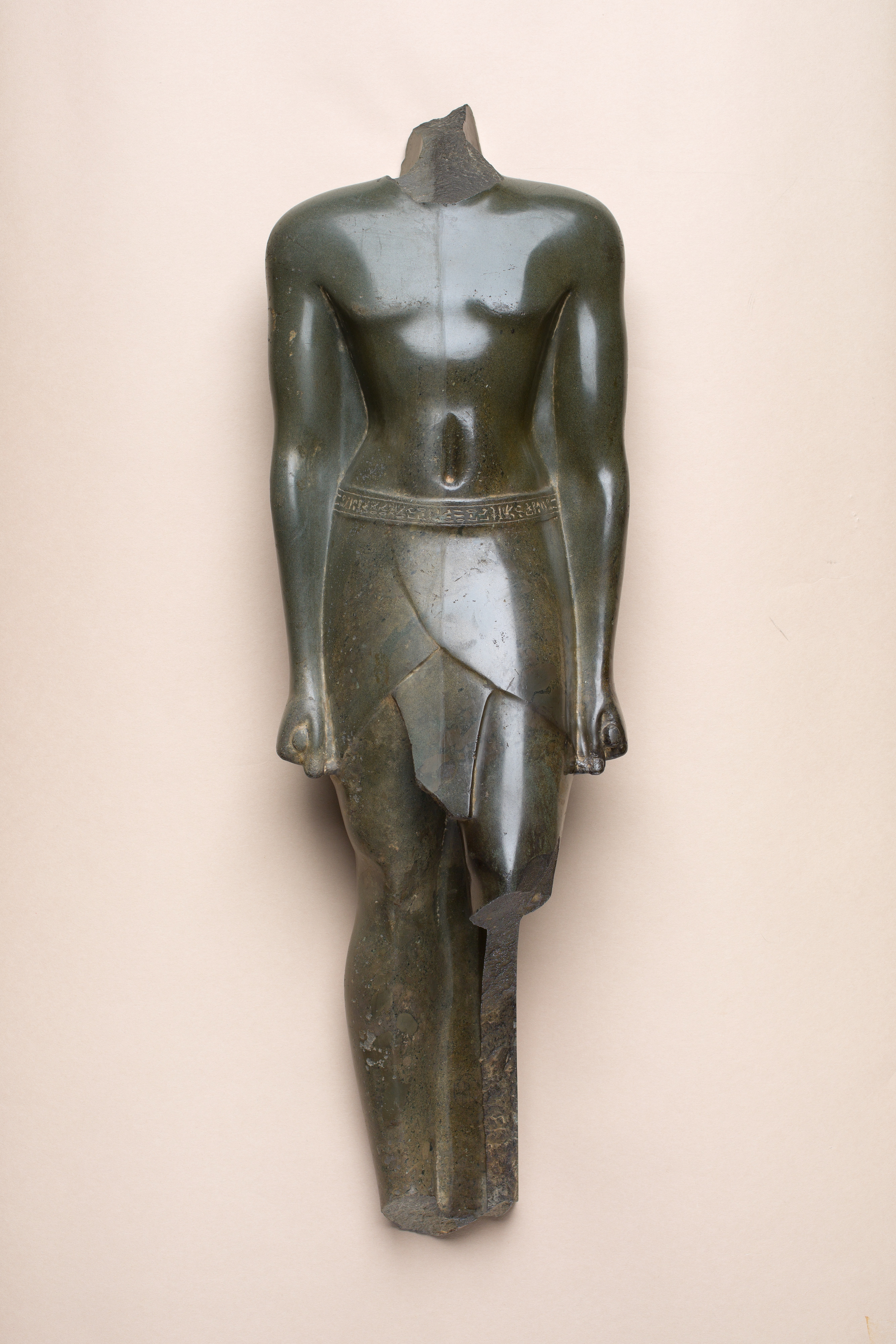
Statue of Tjahapimu wearing a shendyt, Metropolitan Museum of Art

== Cosmetics ==
Use of makeup, especially around the eyes, was a characteristic feature of ancient Egyptian culture from Predynastic times. Black kohl (eye-paint) was applied to protect the eyes, as well as for aesthetic reasons. It was usually made of galena, giving a silvery-black color; during the Old Kingdom, green eye-paint was also used, made from malachite. Egyptian women painted their lips and cheeks, using rouge made from red ochre. Henna was applied as a dye for hair, fingernails and toenails, and perhaps also nipples. Creams and unguents to condition the skin were popular, and were made from various plant extracts.

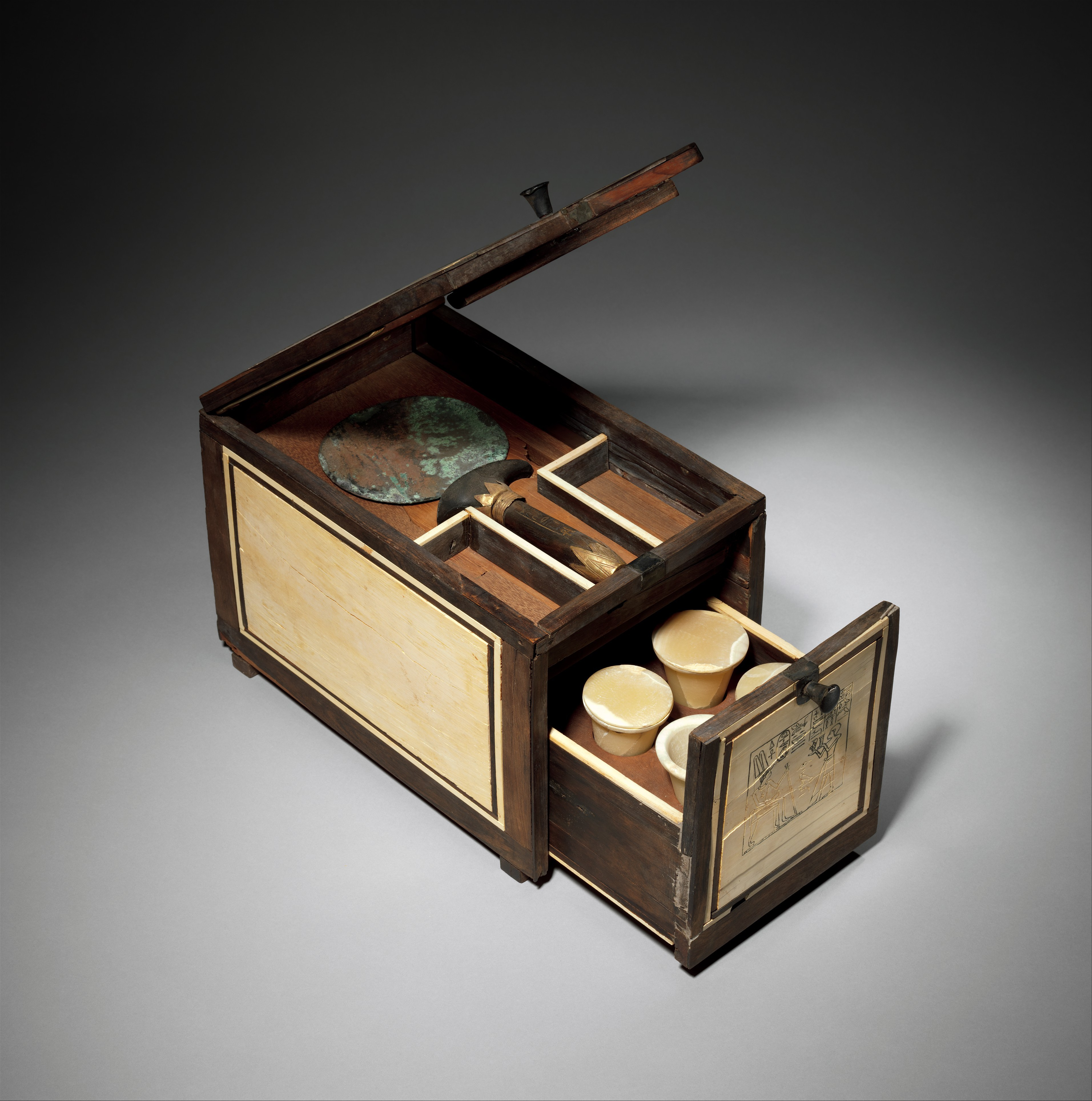
Cosmetic Box of the Royal Butler Kemeni; 1814–1805 BC; cedar with ebony, ivory veneer and silver mounting; height: 20.3 cm (8.0 in); Metropolitan Museum of Art (New York City)

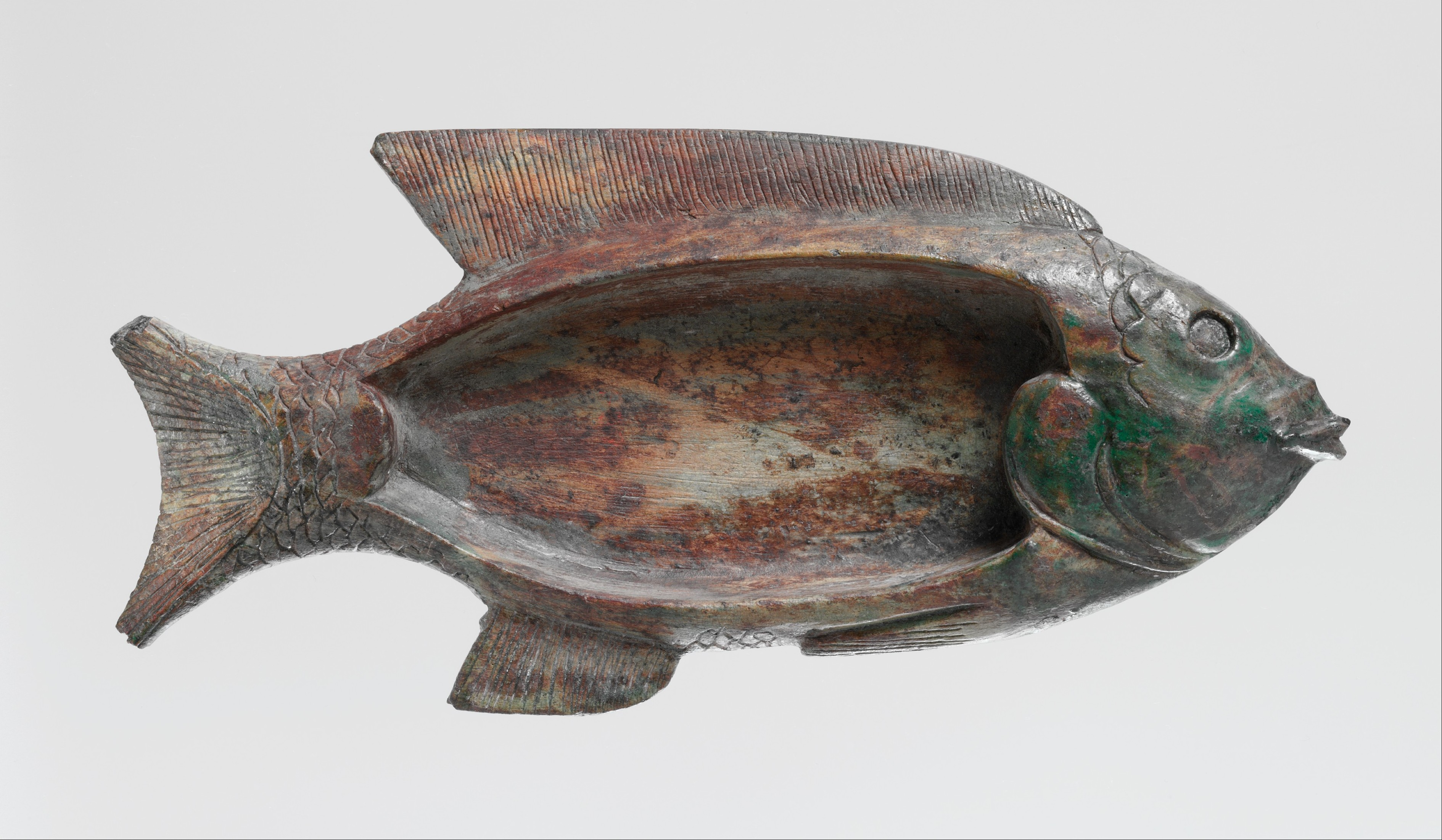
Cosmetic dish in the shape of a tilapia fish; 1479–1425 BC; glazed steatite; 8.6 cm × 18.1 cm (3.4 in × 7.1 in); Metropolitan Museum of Art

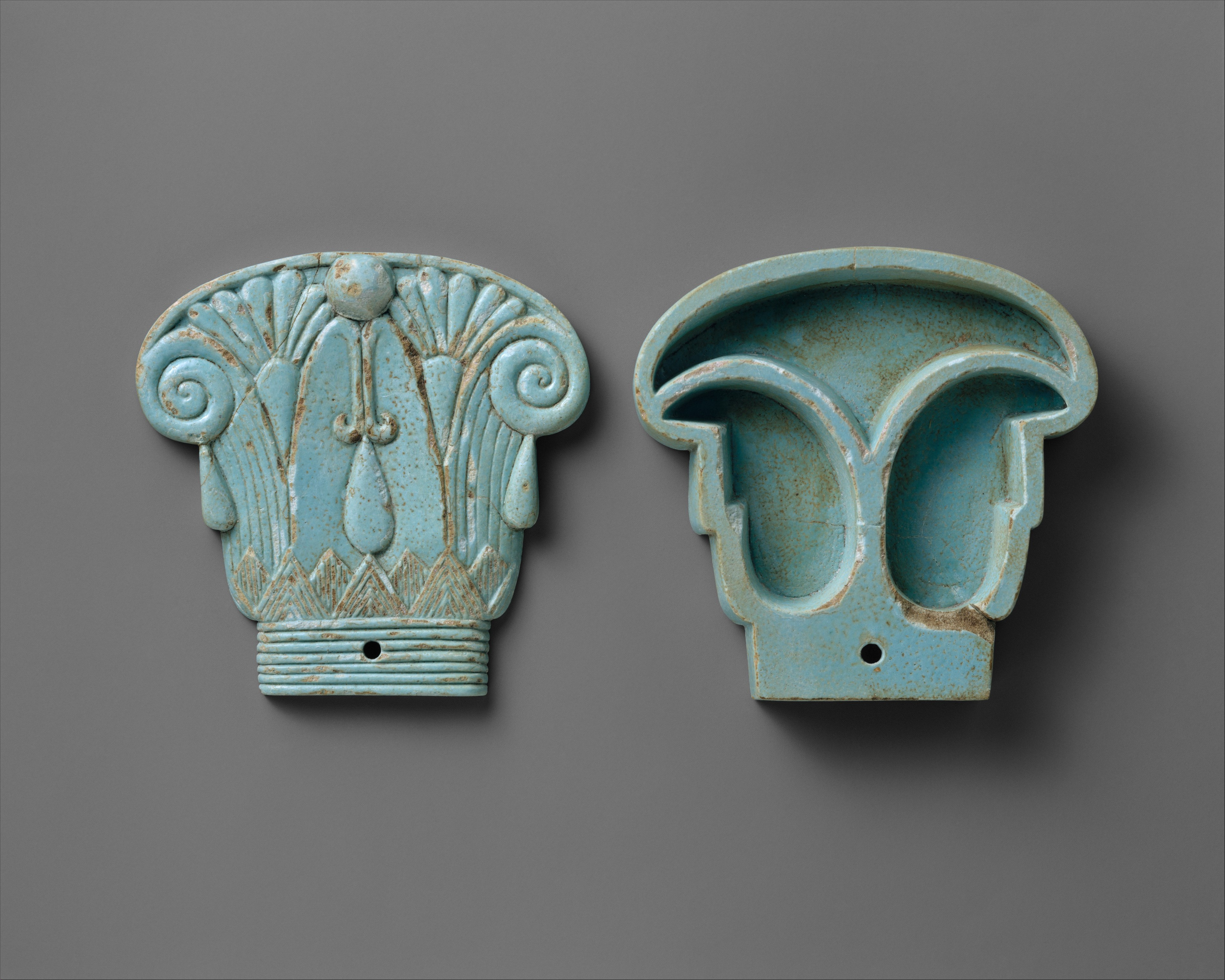
Cosmetic box in the shape of an Egyptian composite capital, its cap being in the left side; 664–300 BC; glassy faience; 8.5 cm × 9 cm (3.3 in × 3.5 in); Metropolitan Museum of Art

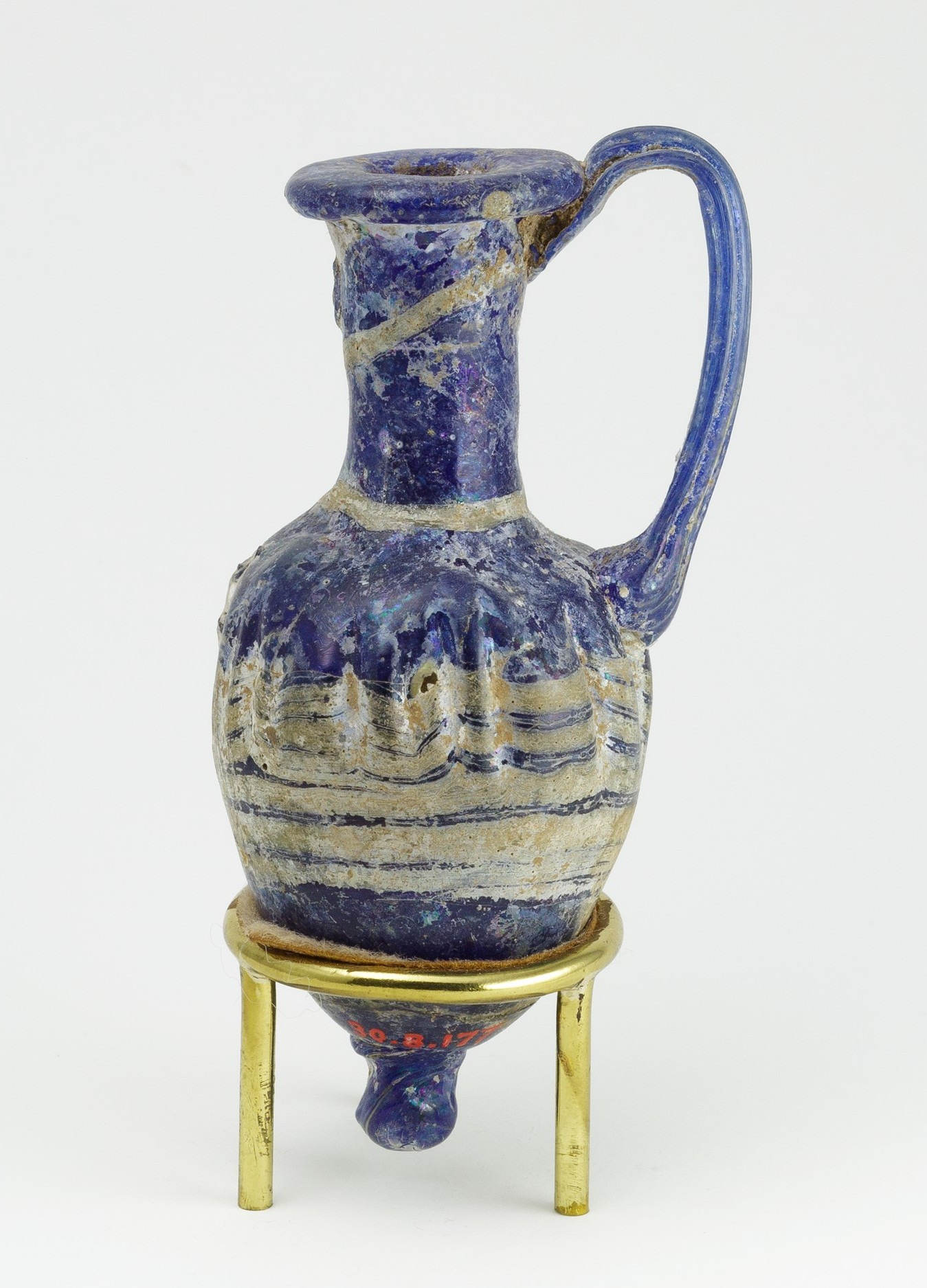
Perfume vase in shape of an amphoriskos; 664–630 BC; glass: 8 cm × 4 cm (3.1 in × 1.6 in); Metropolitan Museum of Art

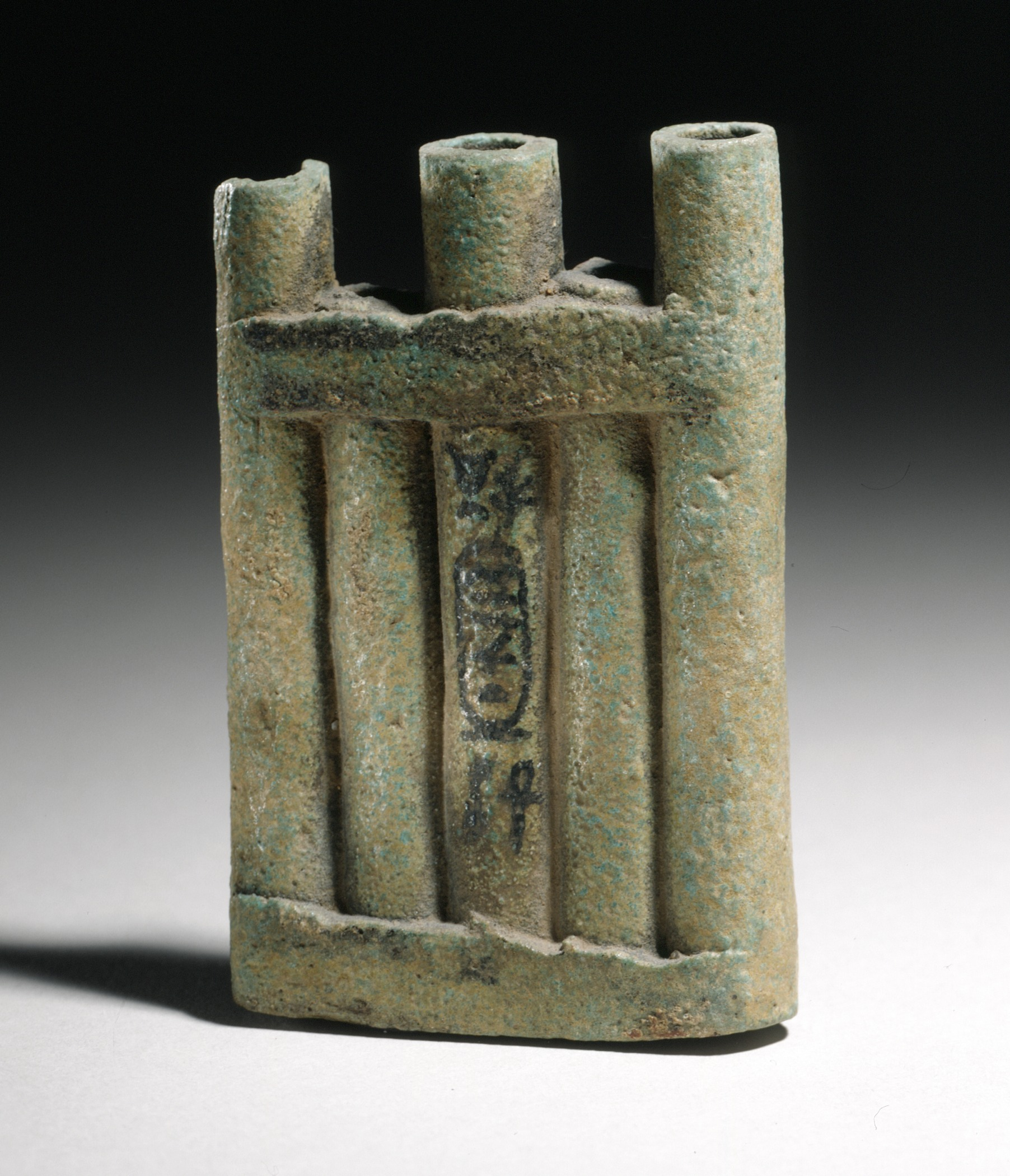
An 18th Dynasty ancient Egyptian kohl container inscribed for Queen Tiye (1410–1372 BC)

== Music ==
On secular and religious occasions, music played an important part in celebrations. Musicians, playing instruments such as the castanets and flute, are depicted on objects from the Predynastic Period. A wide range of percussions, wind and string instruments were known to the ancient Egyptian. They include rattles, clappers, drums, tambourines and the sistrum; pipes, flutes and trumpets; and harps (particularly popular at feasts). The lyre and lute were introduced from the Levant. Musical notation is not attested until the early Ptolemaic Period. Groups of musicians, either mixed gender or female only, are known from the Old Kingdom. Women singers and sistrum-players had an important role in temple cults, especially those of Hathor and Isis. Tomb decoration from all periods indicates that, as today, groups of workers sang to generate a sense of solidarity and to maintain their enthusiasm.

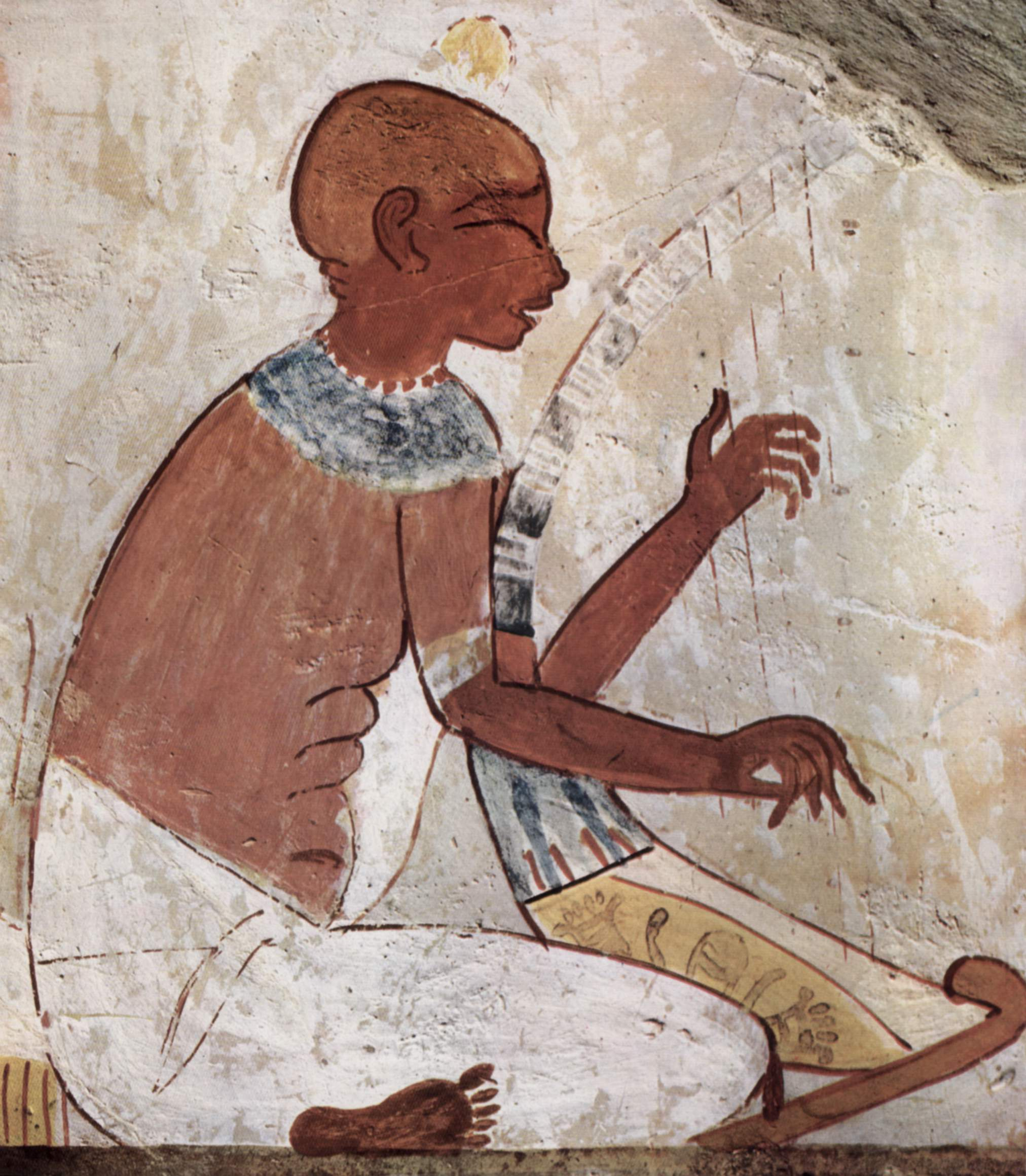
A blind harpist from a mural of the 15th century BC

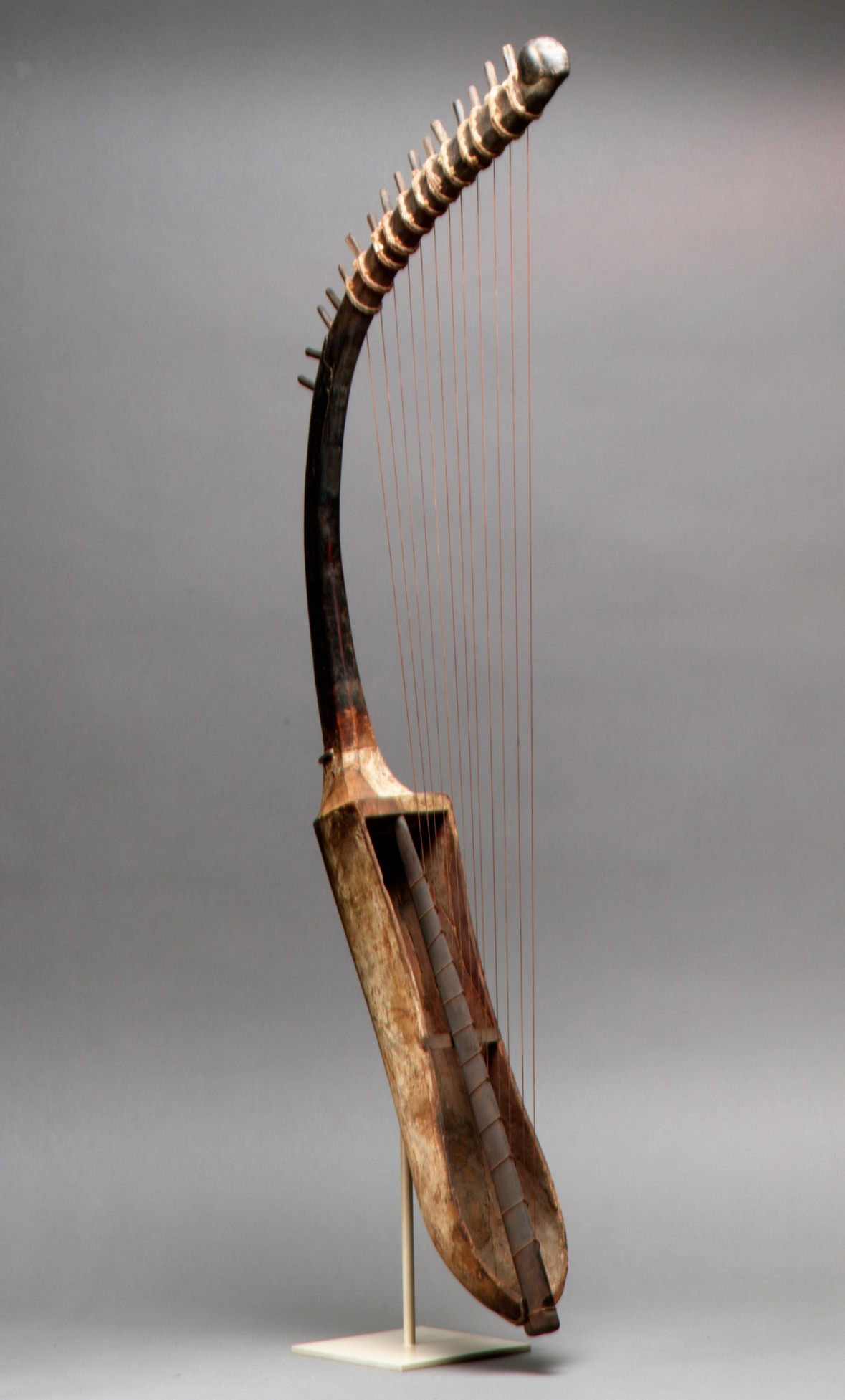
Arched Harp (shoulder harp); 1390–1295 BC; wood; length of sound box: 36 cm; Metropolitan Museum of Art (New York City)

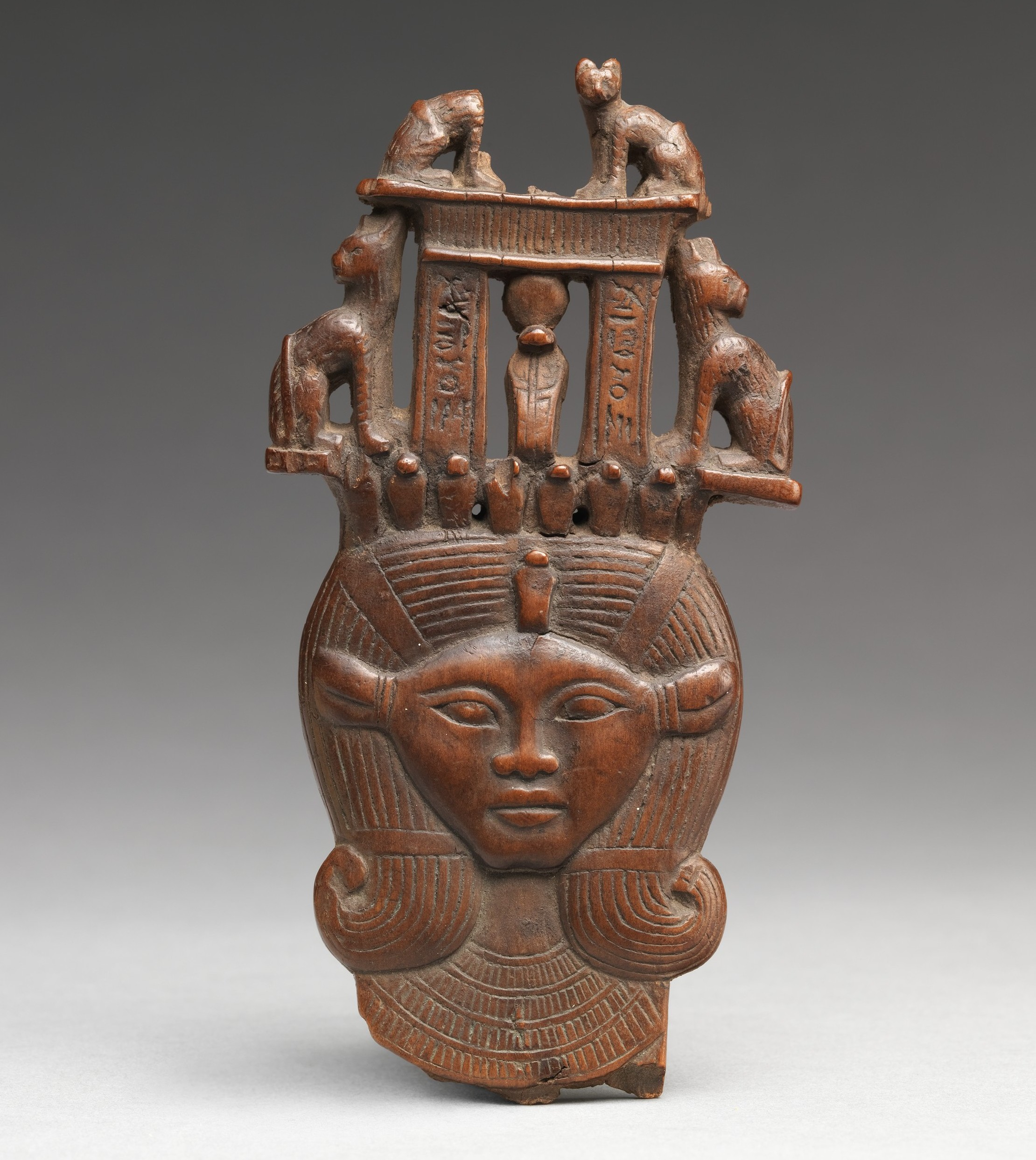
Head of Hathor from a clapper; 1295–664 BC; possibly boxwood; 12 × 6.2 cm; Metropolitan Museum of Art

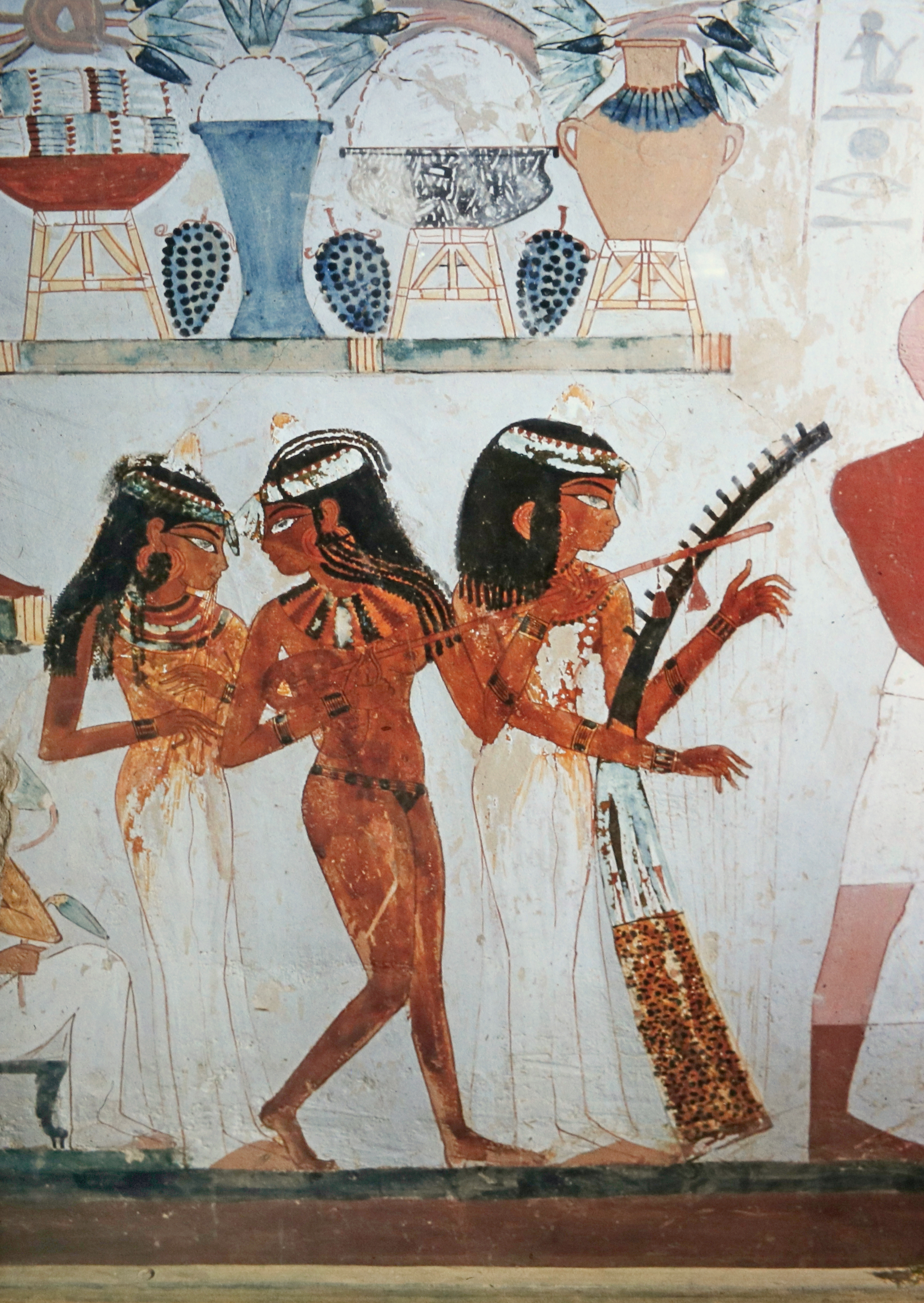
Detail of a frieze from TT52 in which are depicted three musicians

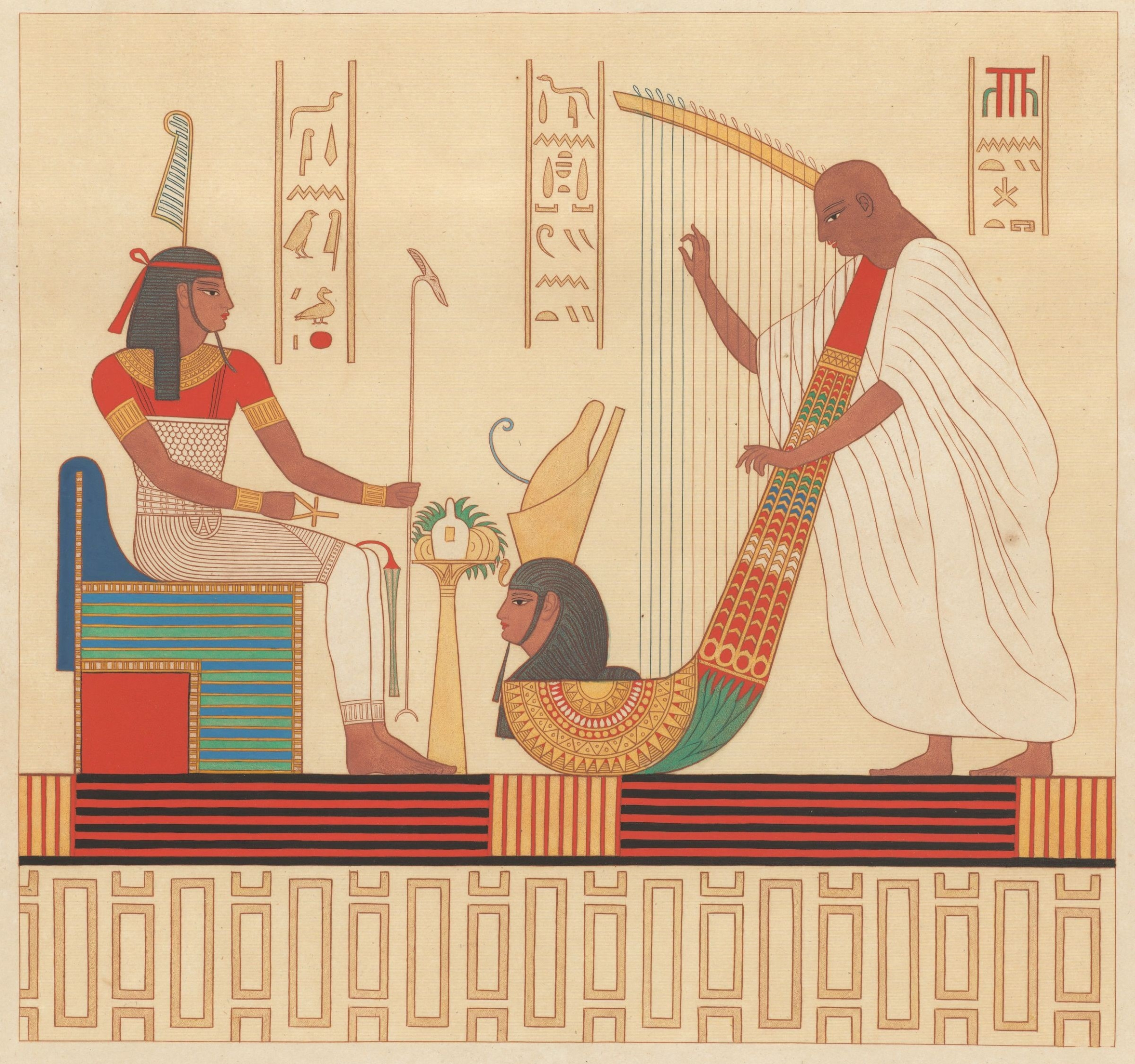
Illustration of a harper playing in front of god Shu

=== Sistrum ===
A sistrum (plural: sistra) is a rattle used in religious ceremonies, especially temple rituals, and usually played by women. Called a "seshsehet" in Egyptian, the name imitates the swishing sound the small metal disks made when the instrument was shaken. It was closely associated with Hathor in her role as "lady of music", and the handle was often decorated with a Hathor head. Two kinds of sistrum are attested, naos-shaped and hoop-shaped; the latter became the more common.

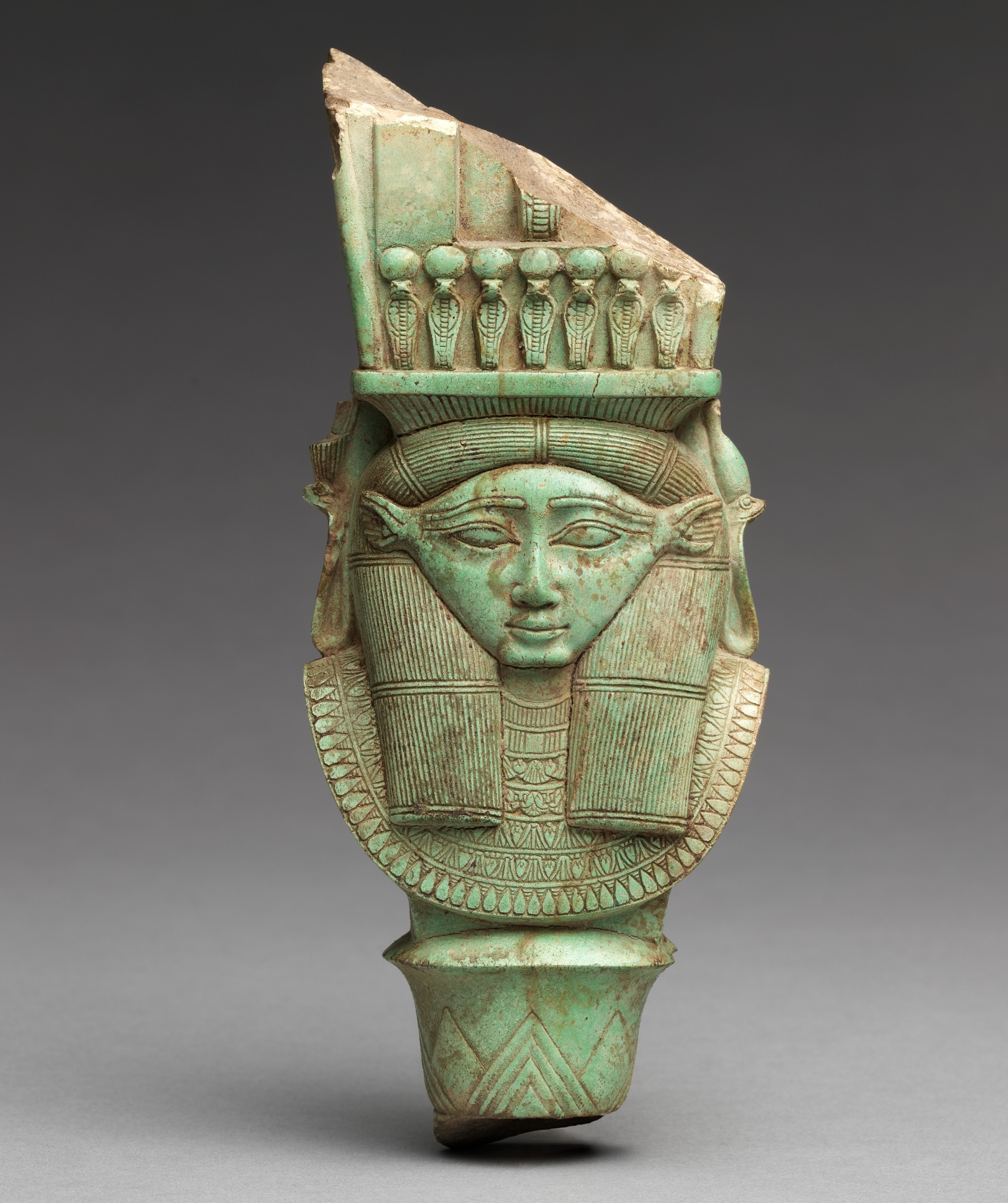
Sistrum decorated with a Hathor face; 664–332 BC; faience; length: 15.5 cm, width: 6.4 cm; Metropolitan Museum of Art (New York City)

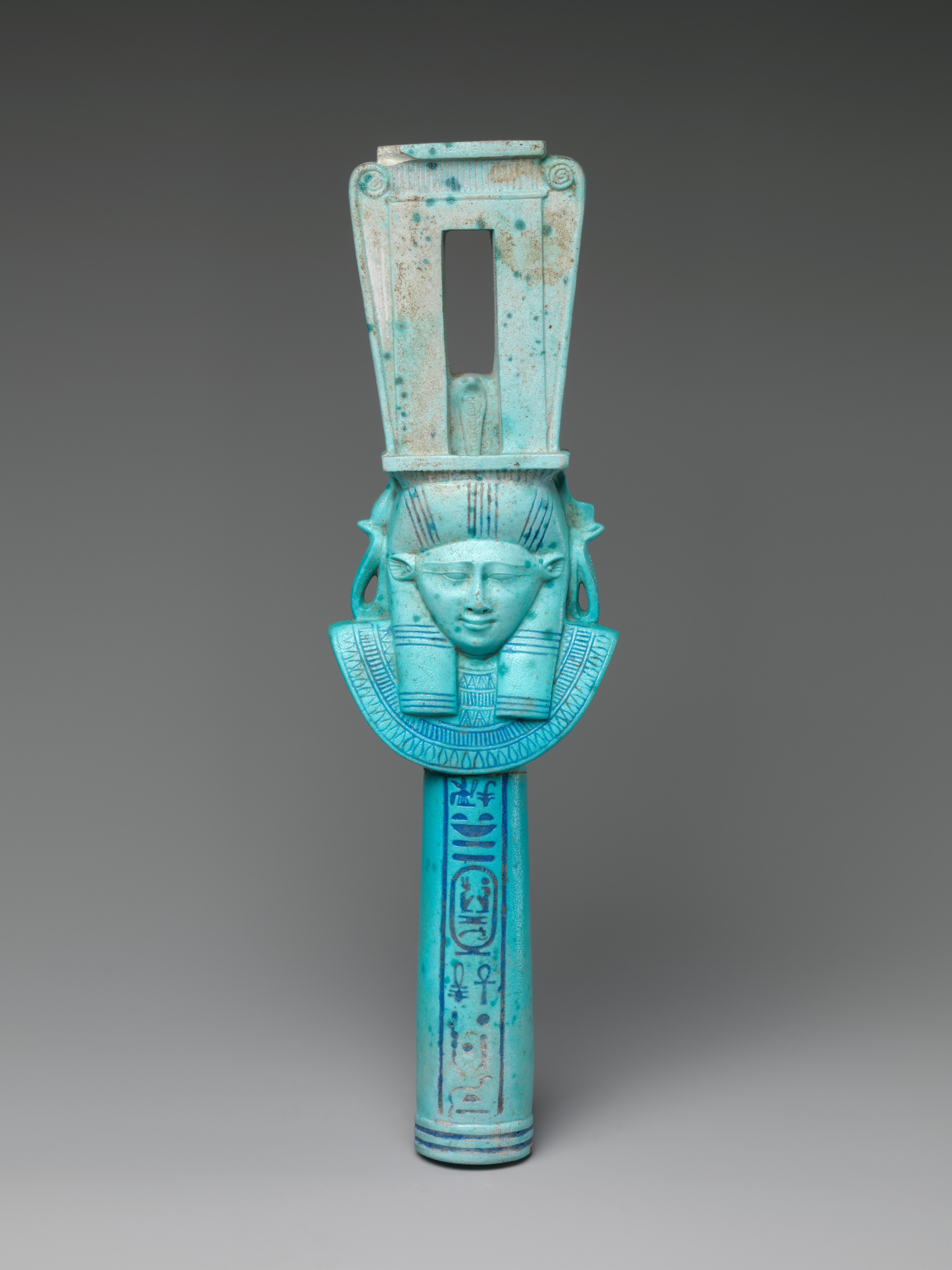
Sistrum inscribed with the name of Ptolemy I; 305–282 BC; faience; 26.7 × 7.5 cm; Metropolitan Museum of Art

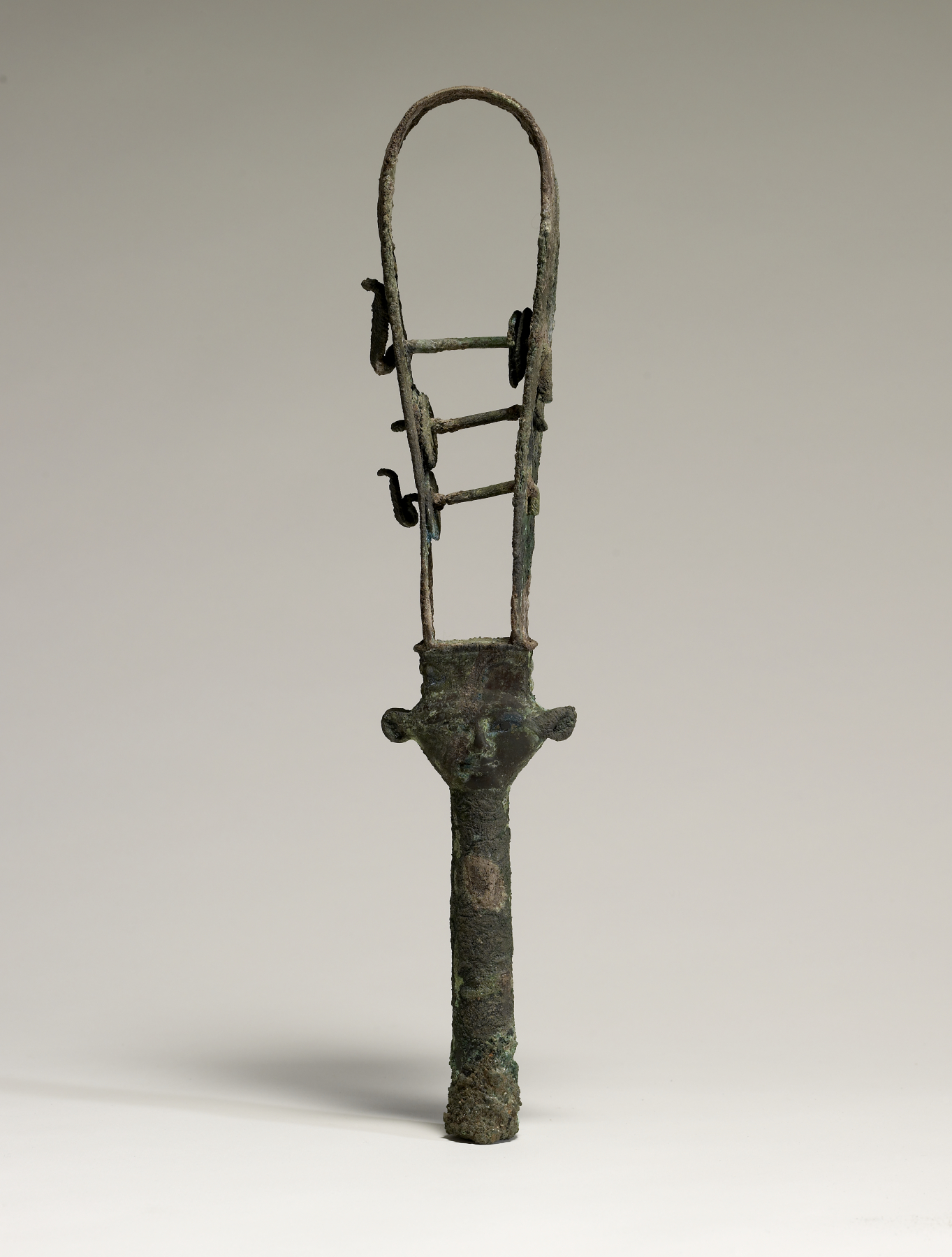
Sistrum with the face of the goddess Hathor depicted with cow ears; 380–250 BC; bronze; 36.3 cm; Walters Art Museum (Baltimore, US)

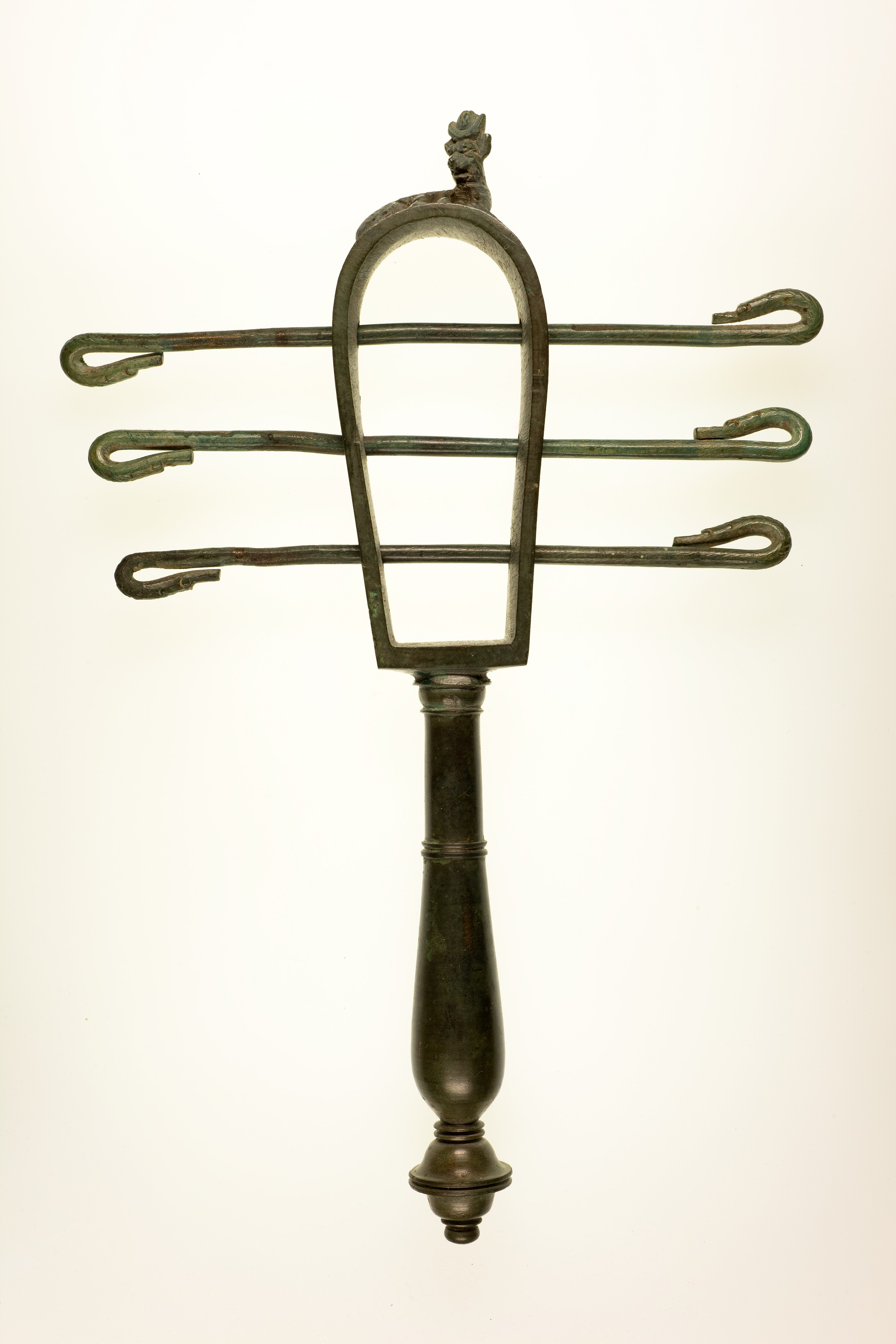
1st–2nd century AD; bronze or copper alloy; 20.6 × 14 cm; Metropolitan Museum of Art

== Funerary art ==
=== Coffins ===
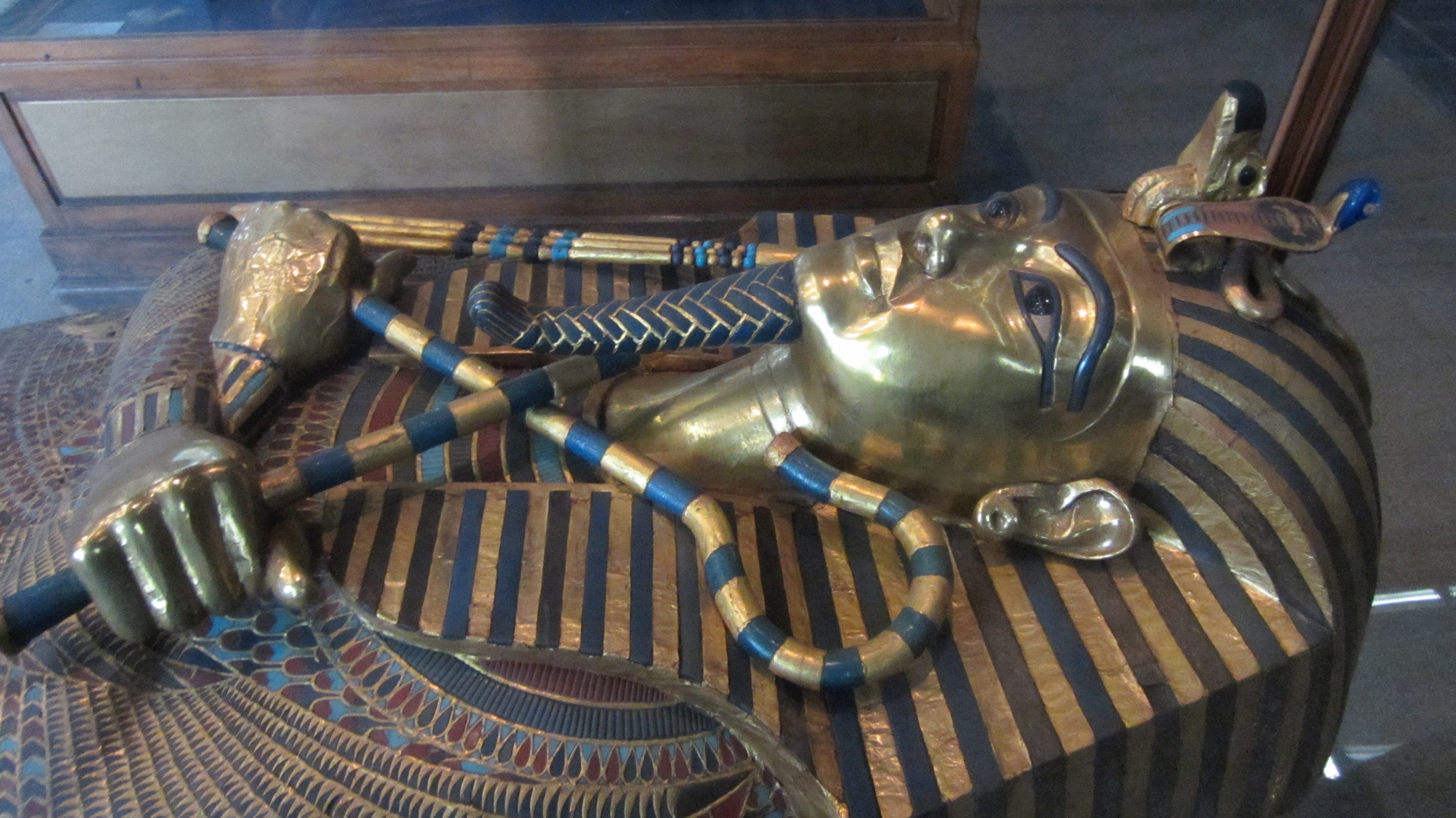
Detail of the middle coffin of Tutankhamun; 1355–1346 BC; wood, gold leaf, semi-precious stones and inlaid glass; 39 × 12 × 12 cm; Egyptian Museum (Cairo). The king is shown in the Osiride form, with arms crossed over the chest and holding the crook and flail symbols of power and authority.

The earliest purpose-built funerary containers for bodies were simple rectangular wooden boxes, attested in the 1st Dynasty. A coffin swiftly became an essential part of the burial equipment. Known euphemistically as the "lord of life", its primary function was to provide a home for the Ka and to protect the physical body from harm. In the 4th Dynasty, the development of longer coffins allowed the body to be buried fully extended (rather than curled up on its side in a foetal position). At the end of the Old Kingdom, it became customary once more for the body to be laid on its side. The side of the coffin that faced east in the tomb was decorated with a pair of eyes so that the deceased could look out towards the rising sun with its promise of daily rebirth. Coffins also began to be decorated on the outside with bands of funerary texts, while pictures of food and drink offerings were painted on the inside to provide a magical substitute for the real provisions placed in the tomb.

In the First Intermediate Period, decorated coffins became a substitute for tomb decoration; in the Middle Kingdom, coffin texts made their first appearance, sometimes accompanied by detailed maps of the underworld. Middle Kingdom coffins show a number of distinct regional styles, echoing the cultural fragmentation of the preceding period. In the 17th and early 18th Dynasties, the Theban area produced characteristic anthropoid rishi (feathered) coffins. These were replaced (except for kings) by other styles of anthropoid coffins which became the standard form throughout the country for the remainder of Egyptian history. The predominance of decorated tombs in the New Kingdom removed the need of object friezes, so coffins were generally undecorated on the inside. However, this situation was reversed again in the Third Intermediate Period when new types of coffin decoration focused on the Osiris myth and extracts from the Book of the Dead, to aid the resurrection of the deceased. In the Ptolemaic and Roman periods, a cartonnage mask was often fixed directly onto the mummy wrappings as a substitute for a coffin.

Coffins were generally made of wood; those of high-status individuals used fine quality, imported cedar. From the Middle Kingdom onward, wealthy individuals were often provided with a set of two or three nested coffins. The most sumptuous coffins might be inlaid with glass or precious stones, while royal coffins were often made from gold or silver.

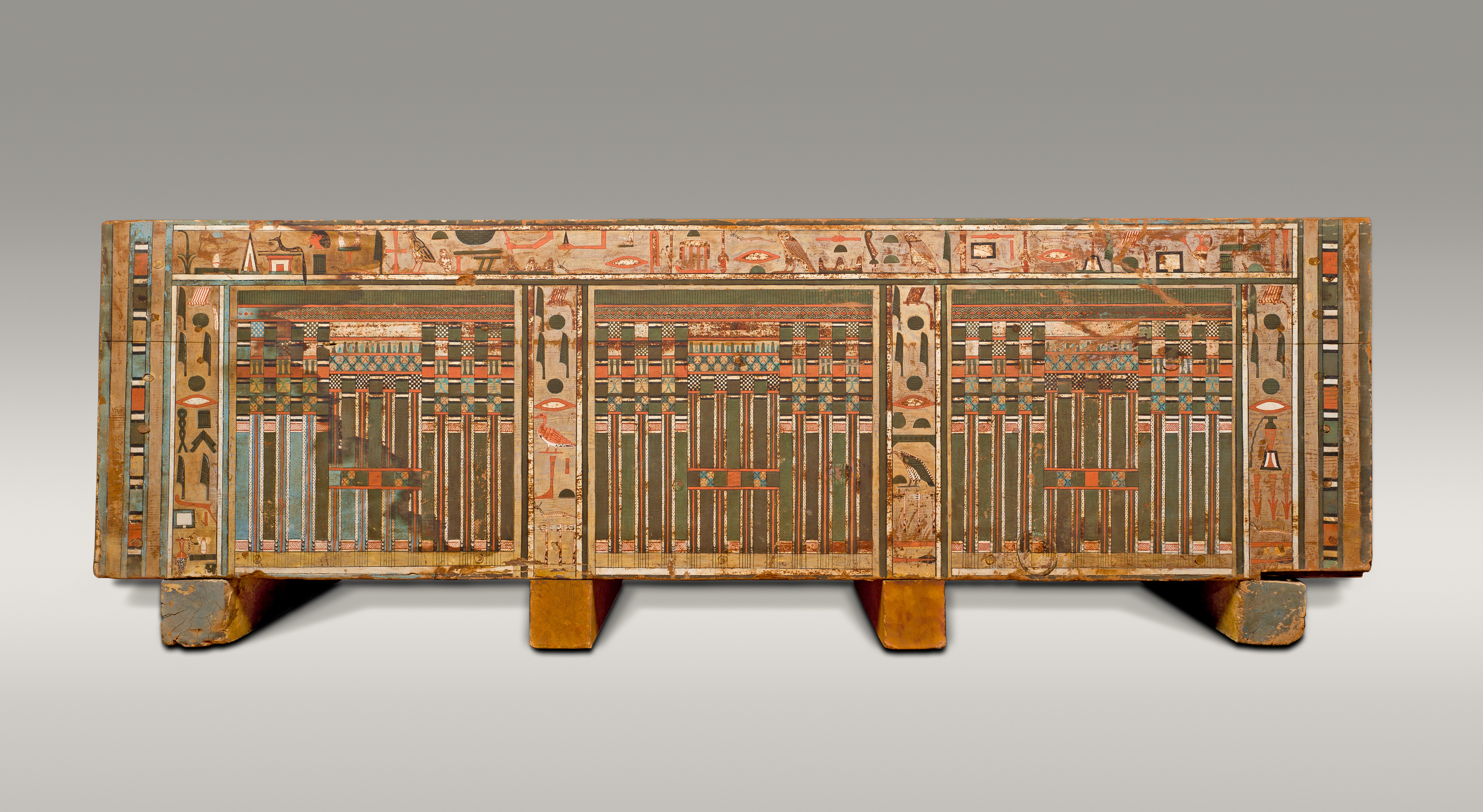
Coffin of the estate manager Khnumhotep; 1981–1802 BC; painted wood (ficus sycomorus); height: 81.3 cm (32.0 in); Metropolitan Museum of Art (New York City)

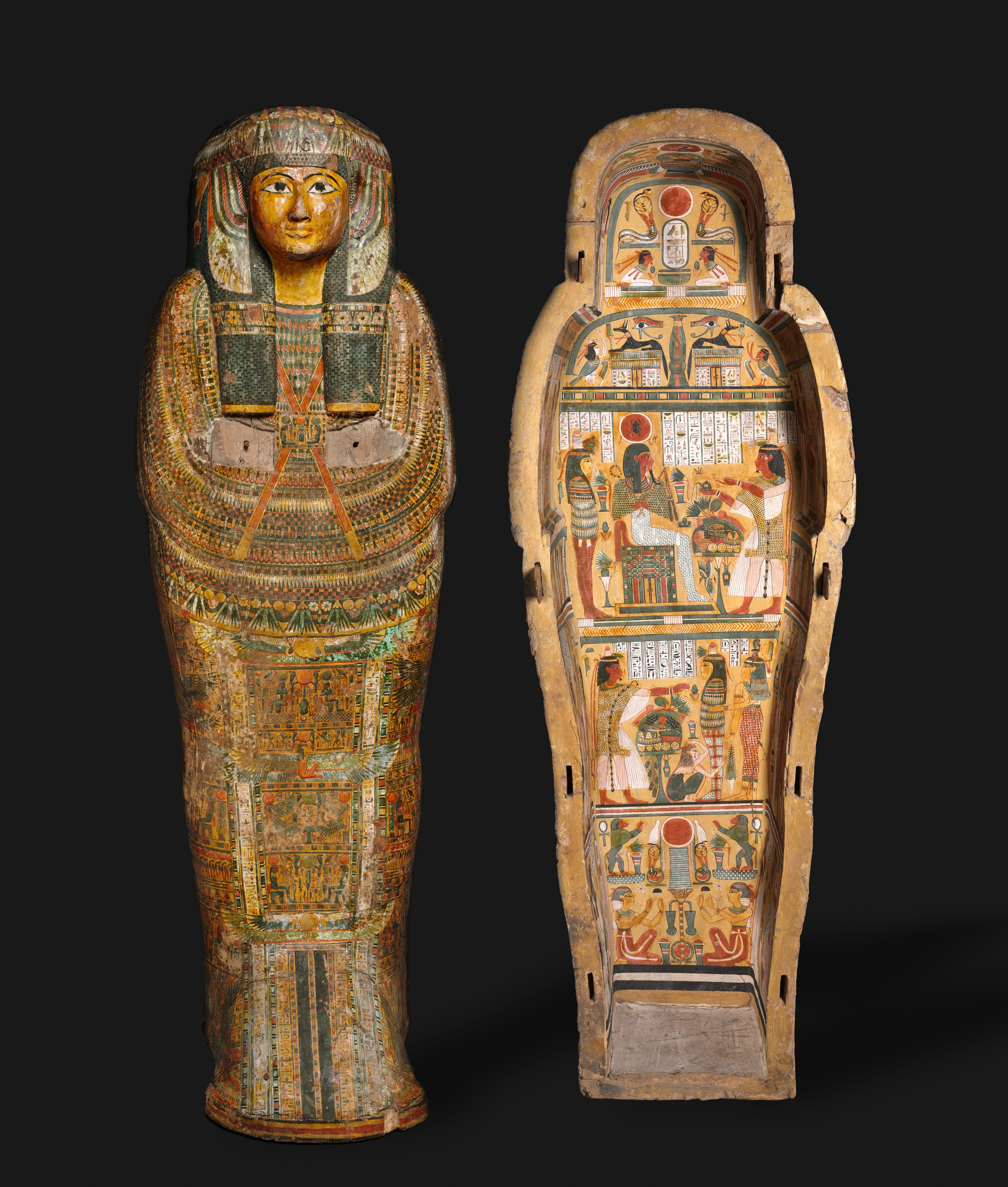
Coffin of Nesykhonsu; c. 976 BC; gessoed and painted sycamore fig; overall: 70 cm; Cleveland Museum of Art (Cleveland, Ohio, US)

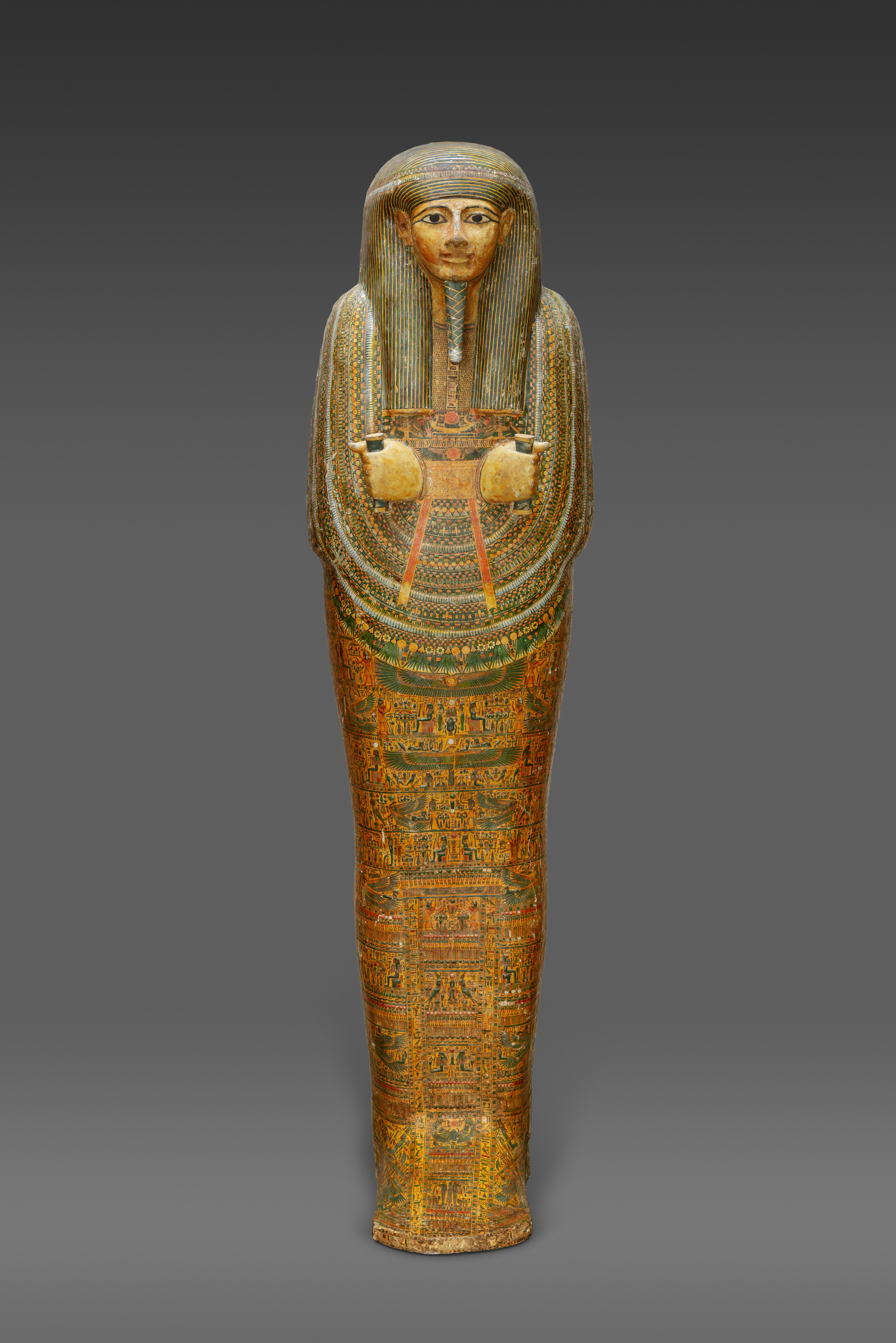
Inner coffin of Amenemopet; 975–909 BC; painted wood & gesso; length: 195 cm (77 in); Metropolitan Museum of Art

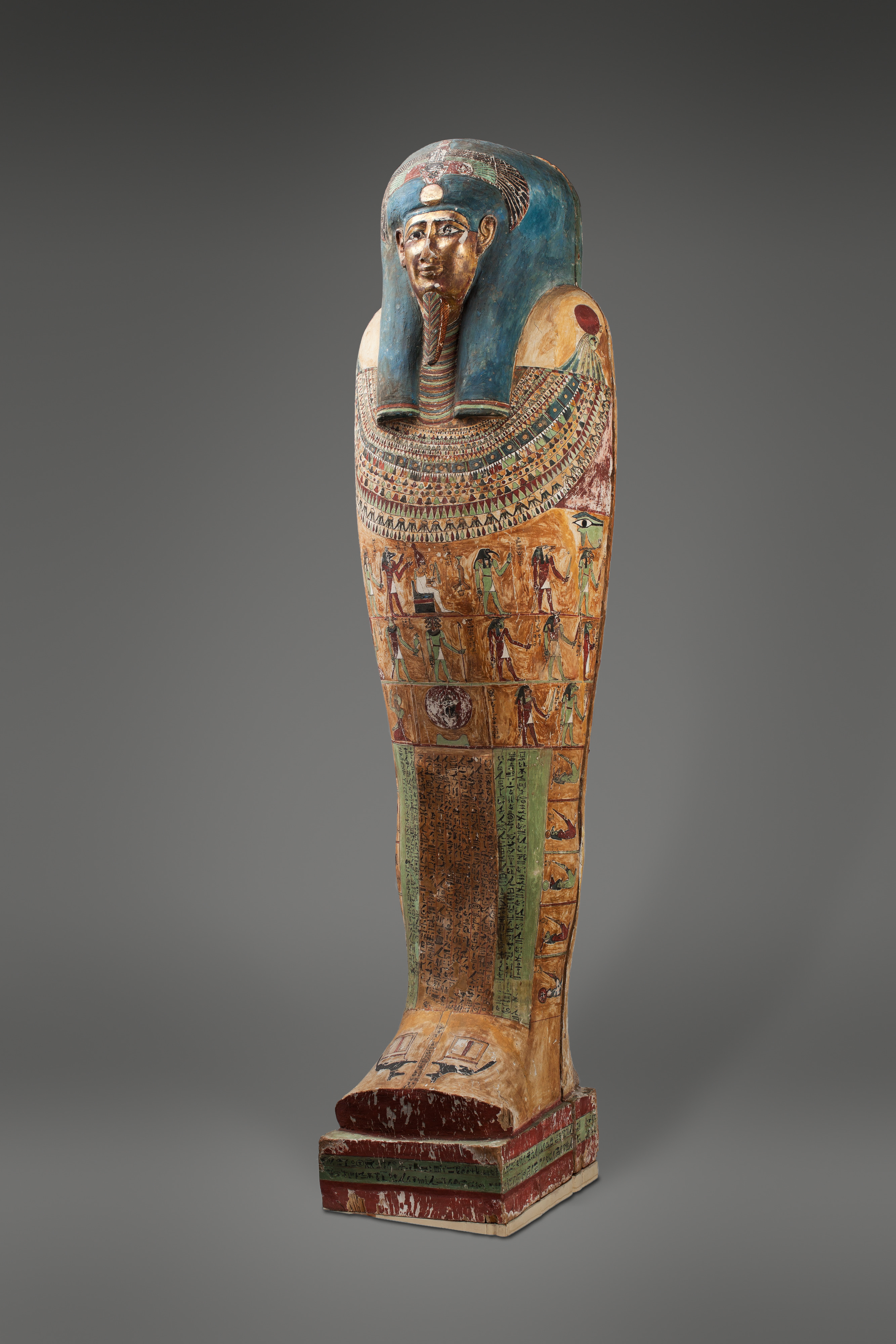
Coffin of Irtirutja; 332–250 BC; plastered, painted and gilded wood; length: 198.8 cm (78.3 in); Metropolitan Museum of Art

=== Canopic jars ===
Canopic jars are vessels which were used for storing the internal organs removed during mummification. These were named after the human-headed jars that were worshiped as personifications of Kanops (the helmsman of Menelaus in Greek mythology) by the inhabitants of ancient Canopus. The practice of evisceration is first attested in the burial of Hetepheres in the early 4th Dynasty. Her organs were stored in a travertine canopic chest divided into four compartments. Later, each organ – the liver, lungs, stomach and intestines – was provided with a separate jar, of stone or pottery, and placed under the symbolic protection of one of the Four sons of Horus. During the First Intermediate Period, the stoppers of canopic jars began to be modeled in the form of human heads. From the late 18th Dynasty, they were more commonly modelled to resemble the heads of the protecting genii (baboon, jackal, falcon and human). This became the standard for canopic equipment in the 19th Dynasty. In the Third Intermediate Period, the mummified organs were generally returned to the body, but wealthy burials could still include a dummy set of jars. The last known royal set of canopic jars were made of Apries. The manufacture of canopic equipment continued into the Ptolemaic Period but ceased by Roman times.

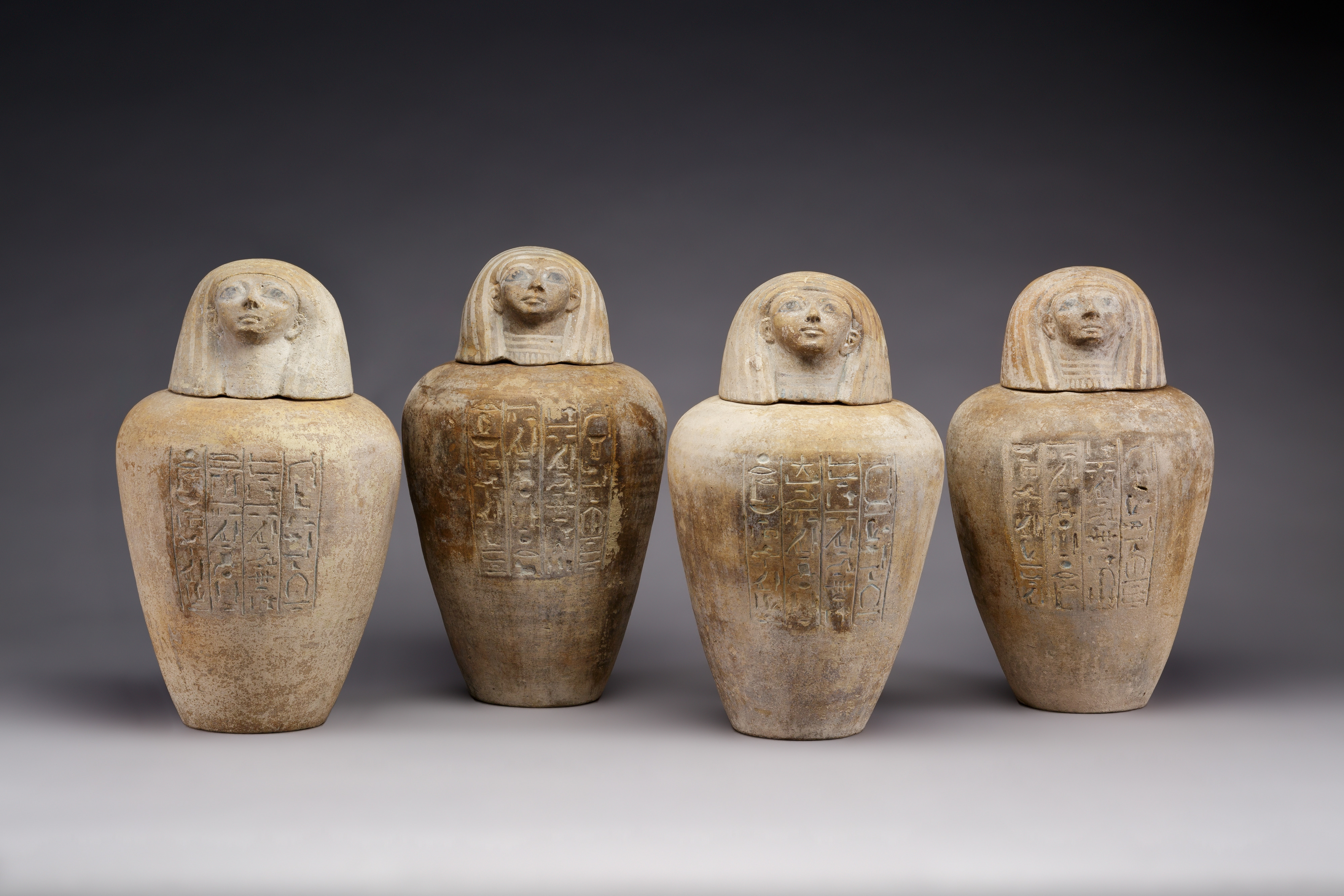
Canopic jars of Ruiu; 1504–1447 BC; painted pottery; Metropolitan Museum of Art (New York City)

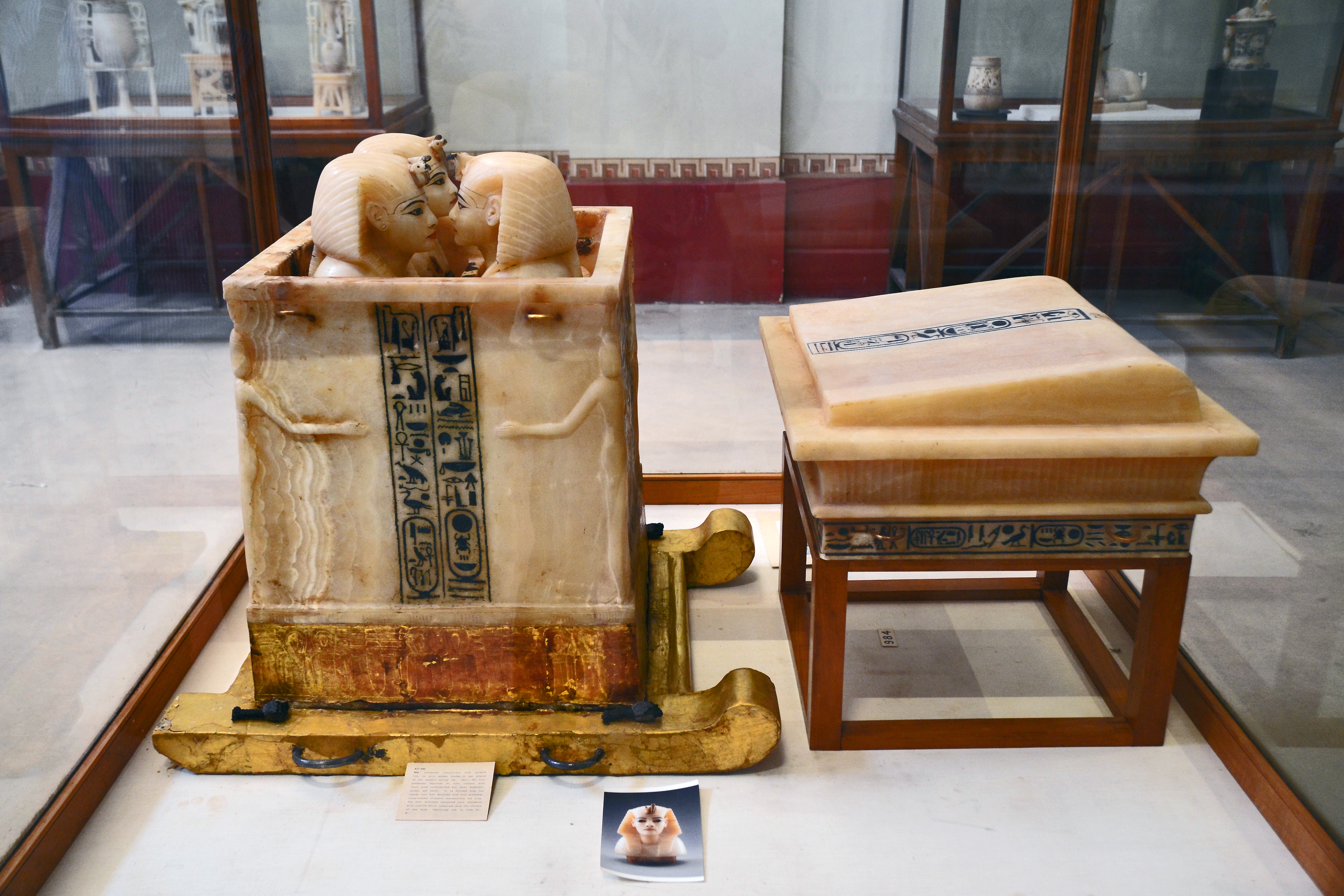
Canopic jars of Tutankhamun; 1333–1323 BC; alabaster; total height: 85.5 cm; Egyptian Museum (Cairo)

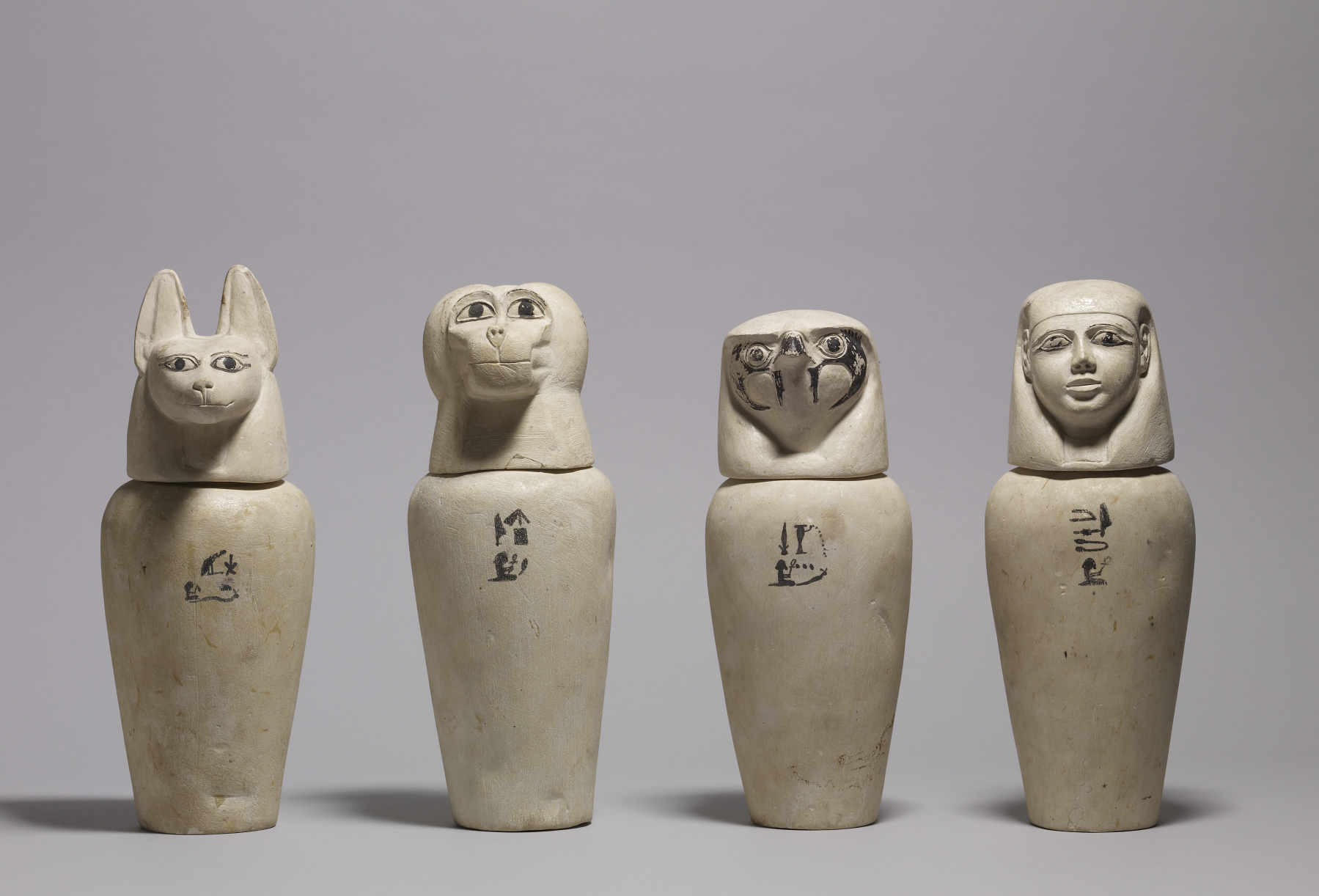
Complete set of canopic jars; 900–800 BC; painted limestone; Walters Art Museum (Baltimore, US)

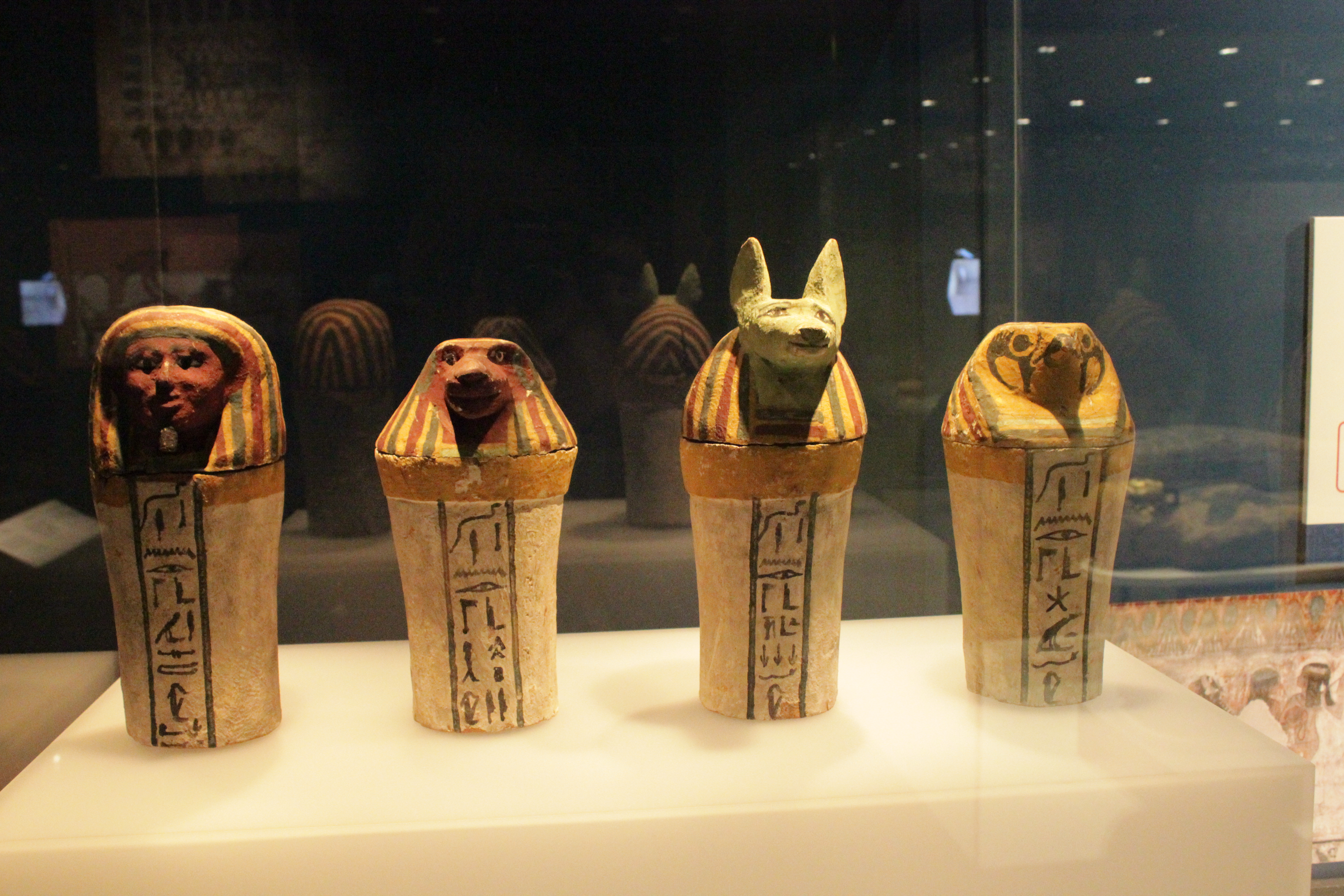
Complete set of canopic jars decorated with hieroglyphics; 744–656 BC; painted sycomore fig wood; various heights; British Museum (London)

=== Masks ===
Funerary masks have been used at all periods. Examples range from the gold masks of Tutankhamun and Psusennes I to the Roman "mummy portraits" from Hawara and the Fayum. Whether in a funerary or religious context, the purpose of a mask was the same: to transform the wearer from a mortal to a divine state.

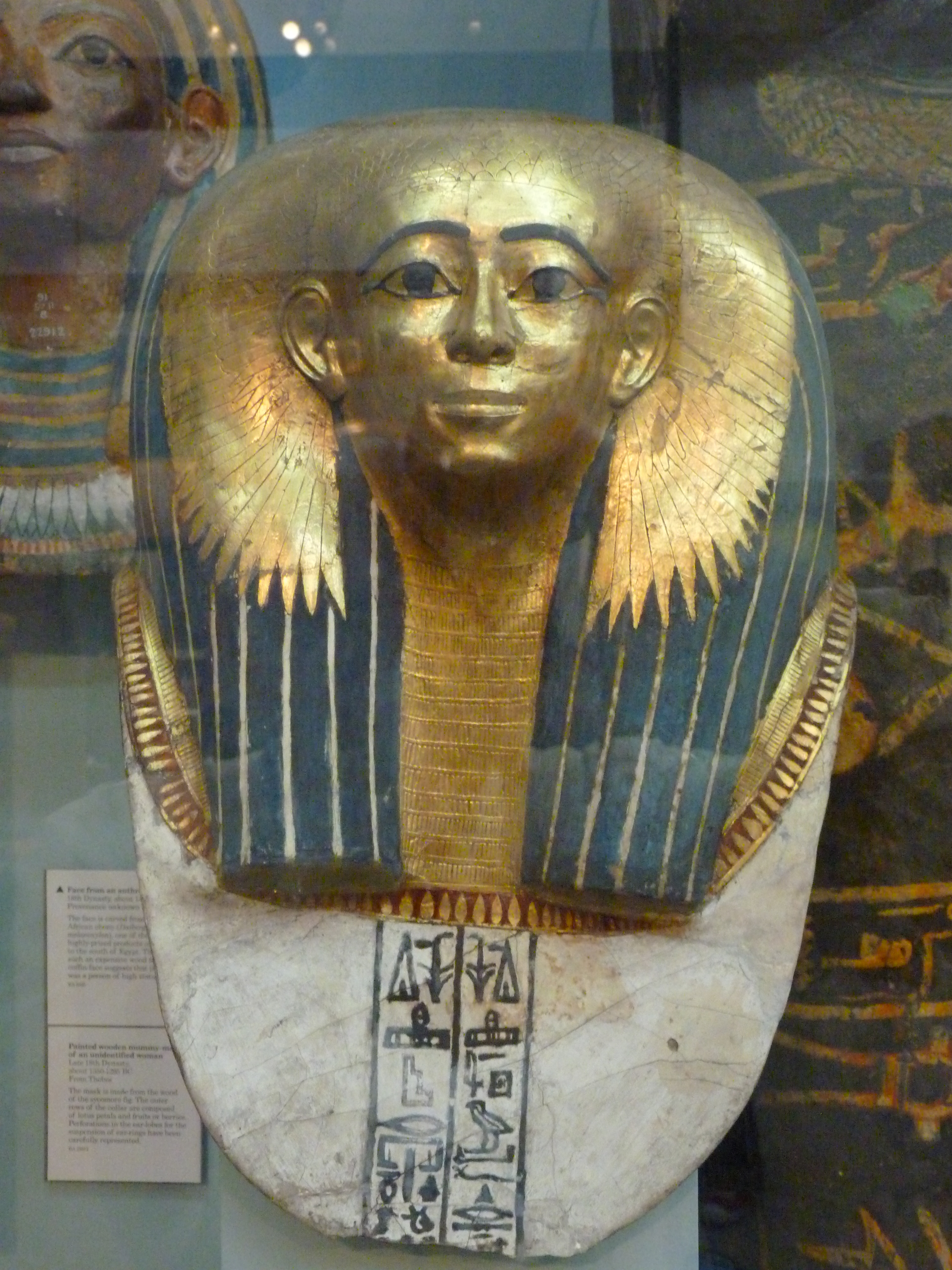
Mask of Sitdjehuti; c. 1500 BC; linen, plaster, gold and paint; height: 61 cm (24 in); British Museum (London)

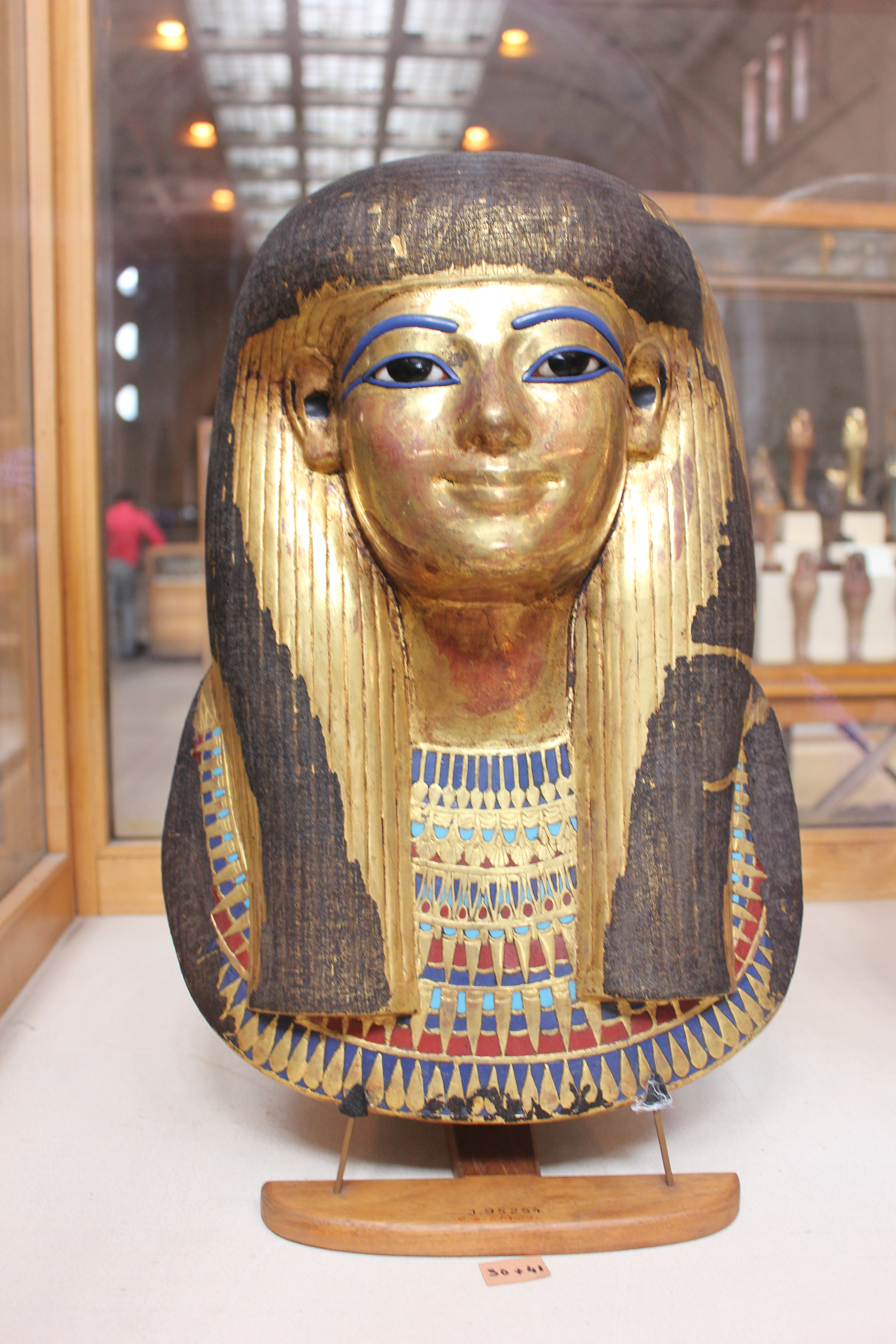
Mask of Tjuyu; c. 1387–1350 BC; gold, past of glass, alabaster and other materials; height: 40 cm; Egyptian Museum (Cairo)

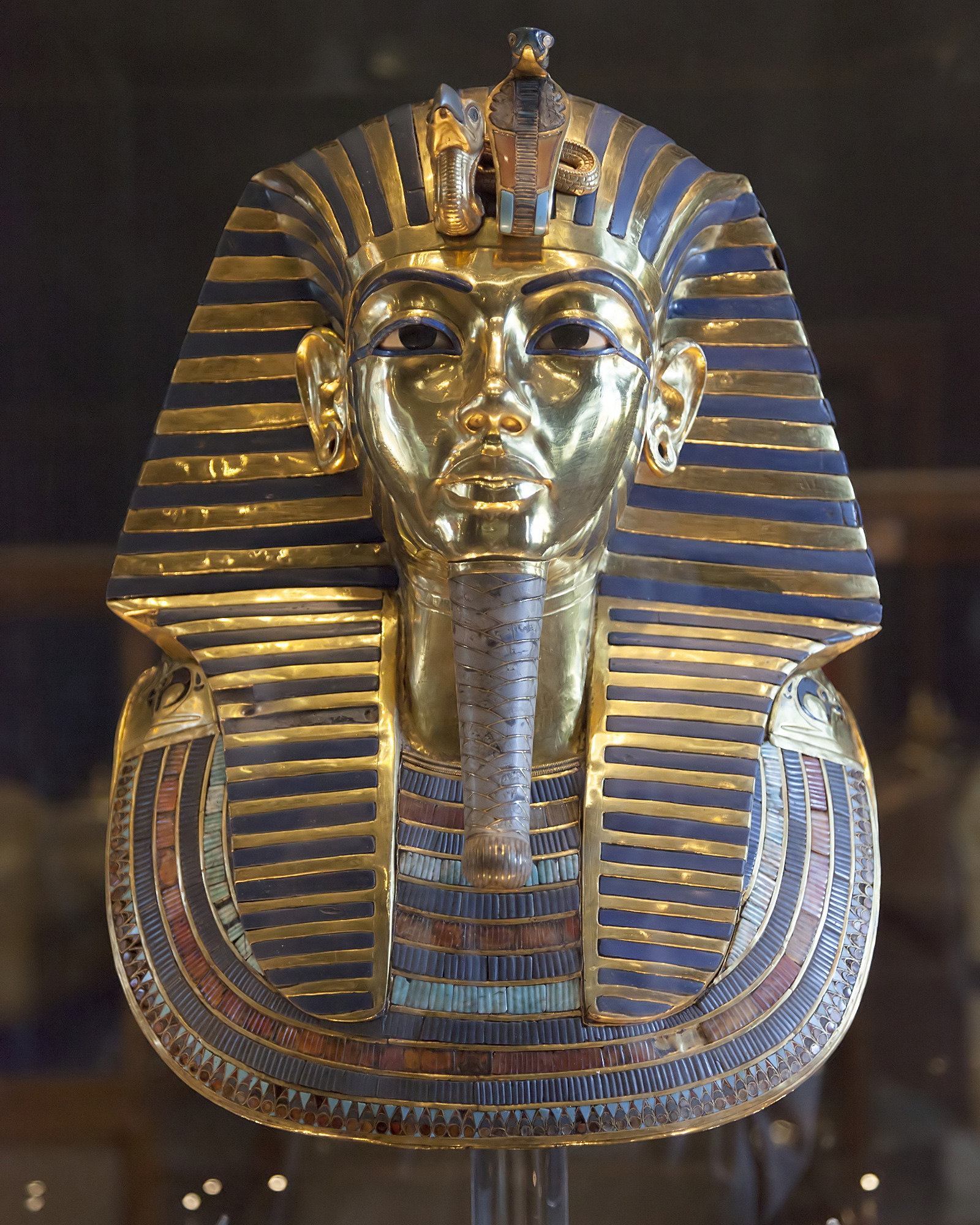
The Mask of Tutankhamun; c. 1327 BC; gold, glass and semi-precious stones; height: 54 cm (21 in); Egyptian Museum

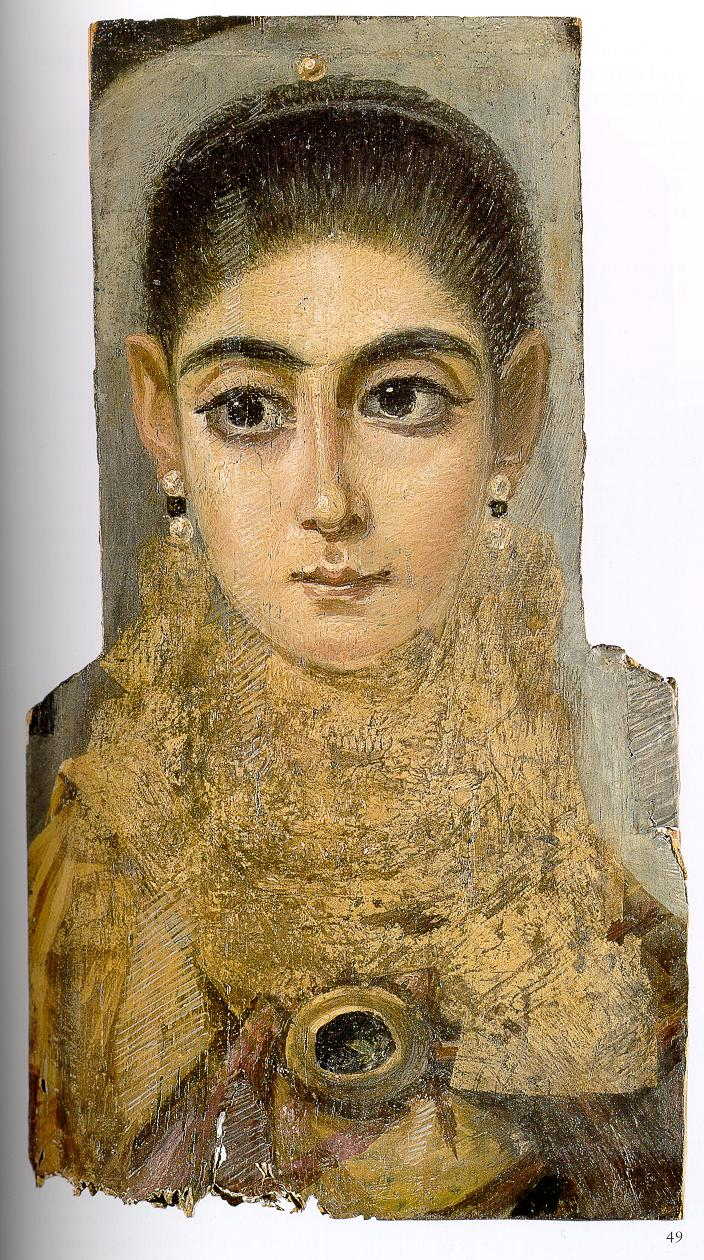
Mummy portrait of a young woman; 100–150 AD; cedar wood, encaustic painting and gold; height: 42 cm, width: 24 cm; Louvre

=== Ushabti ===
Ushabtis (a.k.a. shawabti or shabti) are funerary figurines. Their purpose was to act as a substitute for the deceased when he was called upon to perform agricultural work or corvée labor in the afterlife. Ushabtis evolved in the Middle Kingdom from the servant statues included among grave goods. The earliest examples were crude statuettes in wax, clay or wood; later, they were fashioned as mummiform figures and, from the end of the 12th Dynasty, they were customarily inscribed with the "ushabti text" (chapter 6 of the Book of the dead which specifies the ushabti's duties).

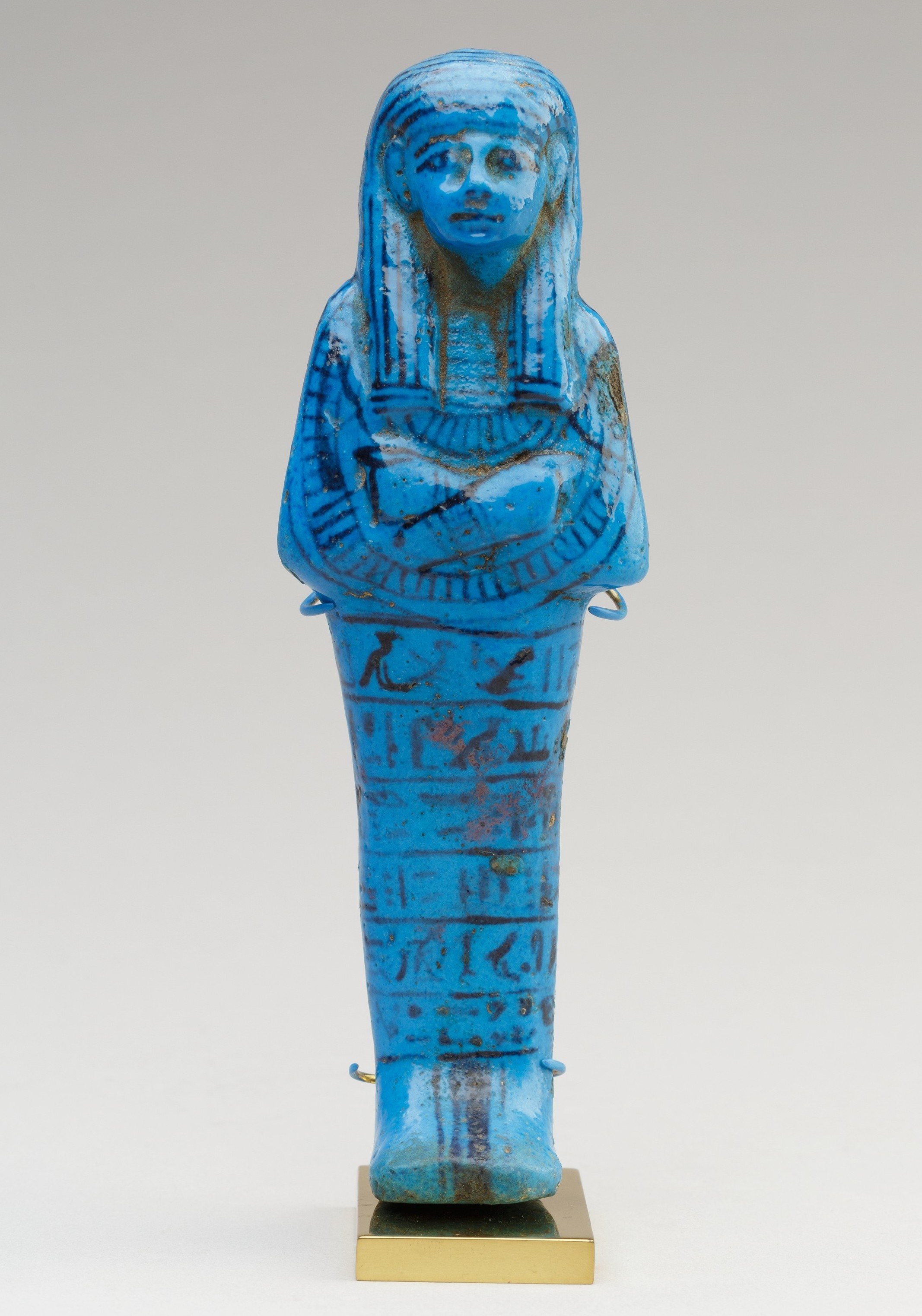
Shabti of Paser, the vizier of Seti I and Ramesses II; 1294–1213 BC; faience; height: 15 cm, width: 4.9 cm; Metropolitan Museum of Art (New York City)

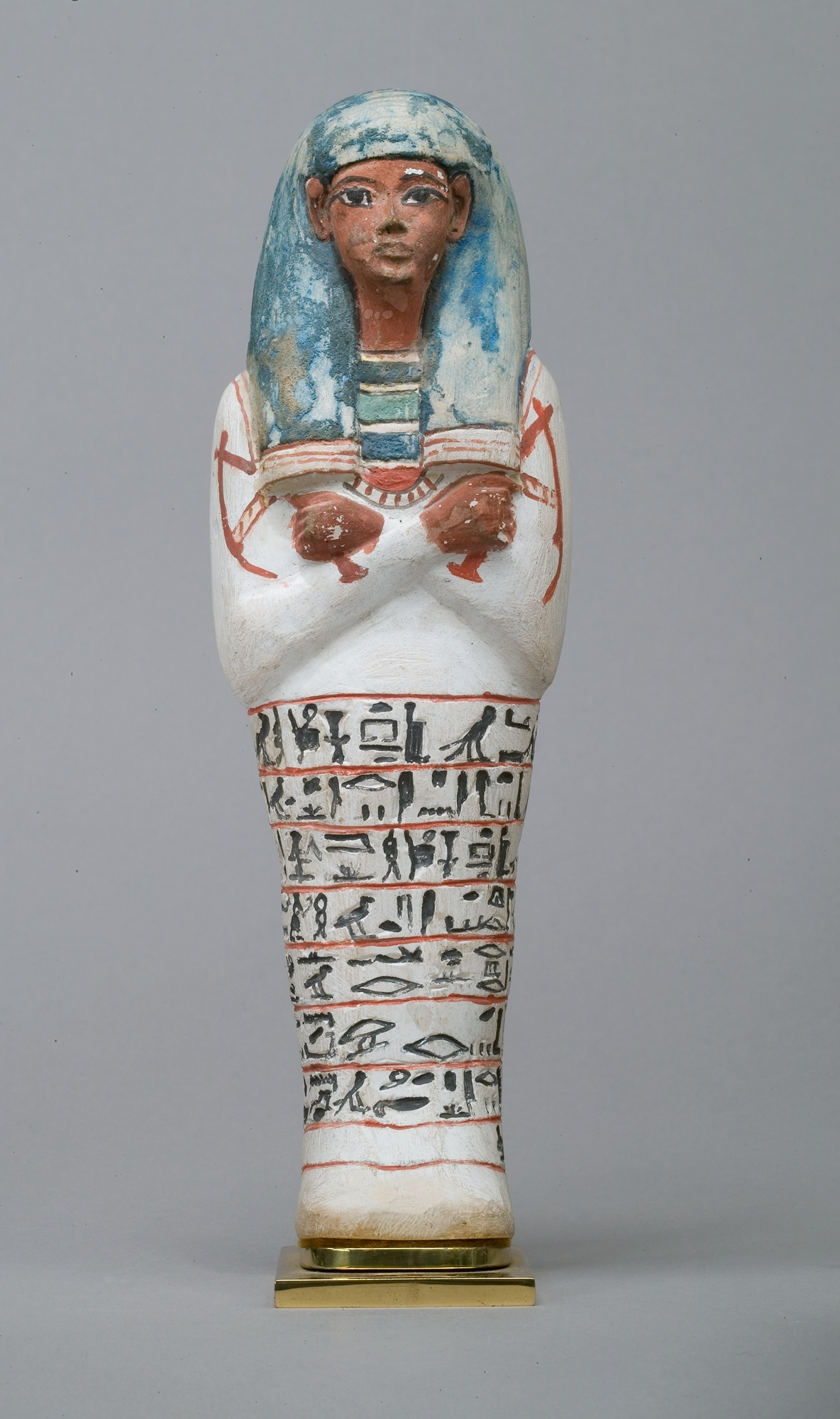
Shabti of Sennedjem; 1279–1213 BC; painted limestone; height: 27 cm; Metropolitan Museum of Art

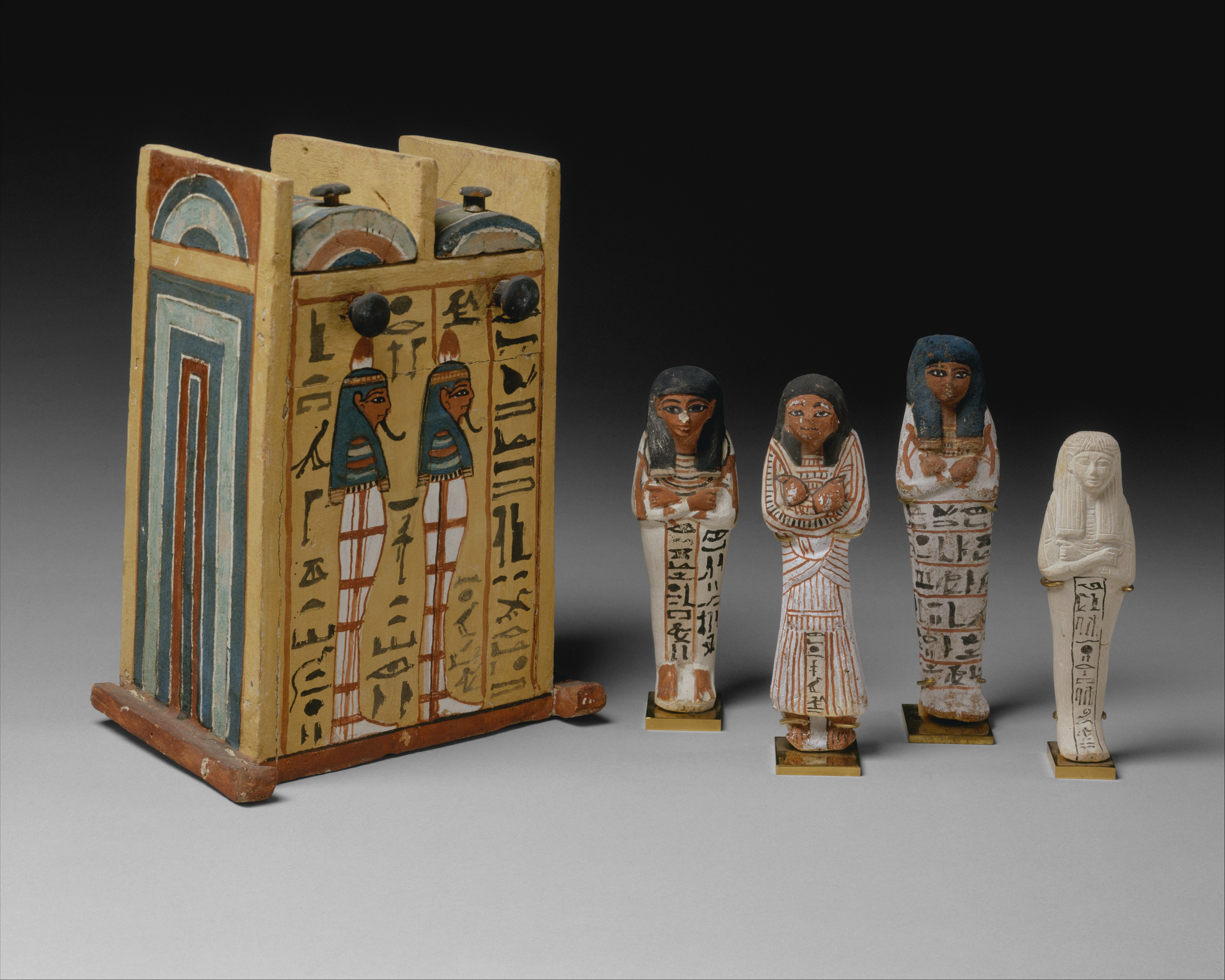
Four ushabtis of Khabekhnet and their box; 1279–1213 BC; painted limestone; height of the ushabtis: 16.7 cm; Metropolitan Museum of Art

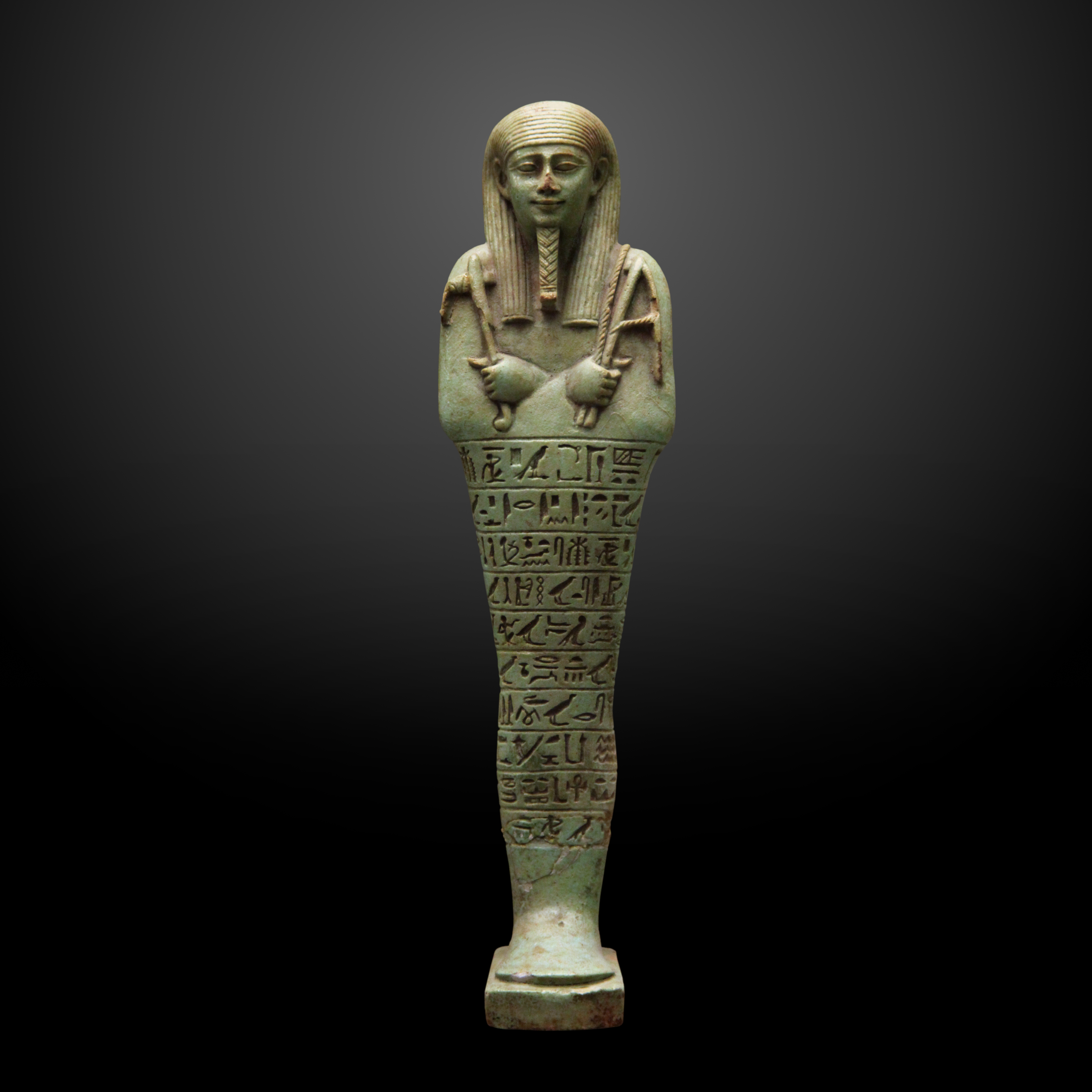
Ushabti; 360–343 BC; ceramic and enamel; 26.7 × 7.1 cm; from Saqqara; Museum of Art and History (Geneva, Switzerland)

== Art of Meroë ==
Ancient Egypt shared a long and complex history with the Nile Valley to the south, the region called Nubia. Evidence for artistic production here is similarly ancient to that in Egypt, with notable artifacts contemporaneous to the pre-dynastic period including a well known incense burner from the site of Qustul, Egypt, and various pieces of glazed pottery attributed to the A-Group culture.

During the period of the Kerma culture and continuing with the Kingdom of Kush based at Napata and then Meroë, Nubian cultures absorbed Egyptian influences at various times, for both political and religious reasons, and also absorbed influences from Hellenistic, Roman, and other cultures. The result is a varied and diverse Nubian artistic corpus drawing upon and recontextualizing numerous indigenous and foreign cultural traditions to local ends.

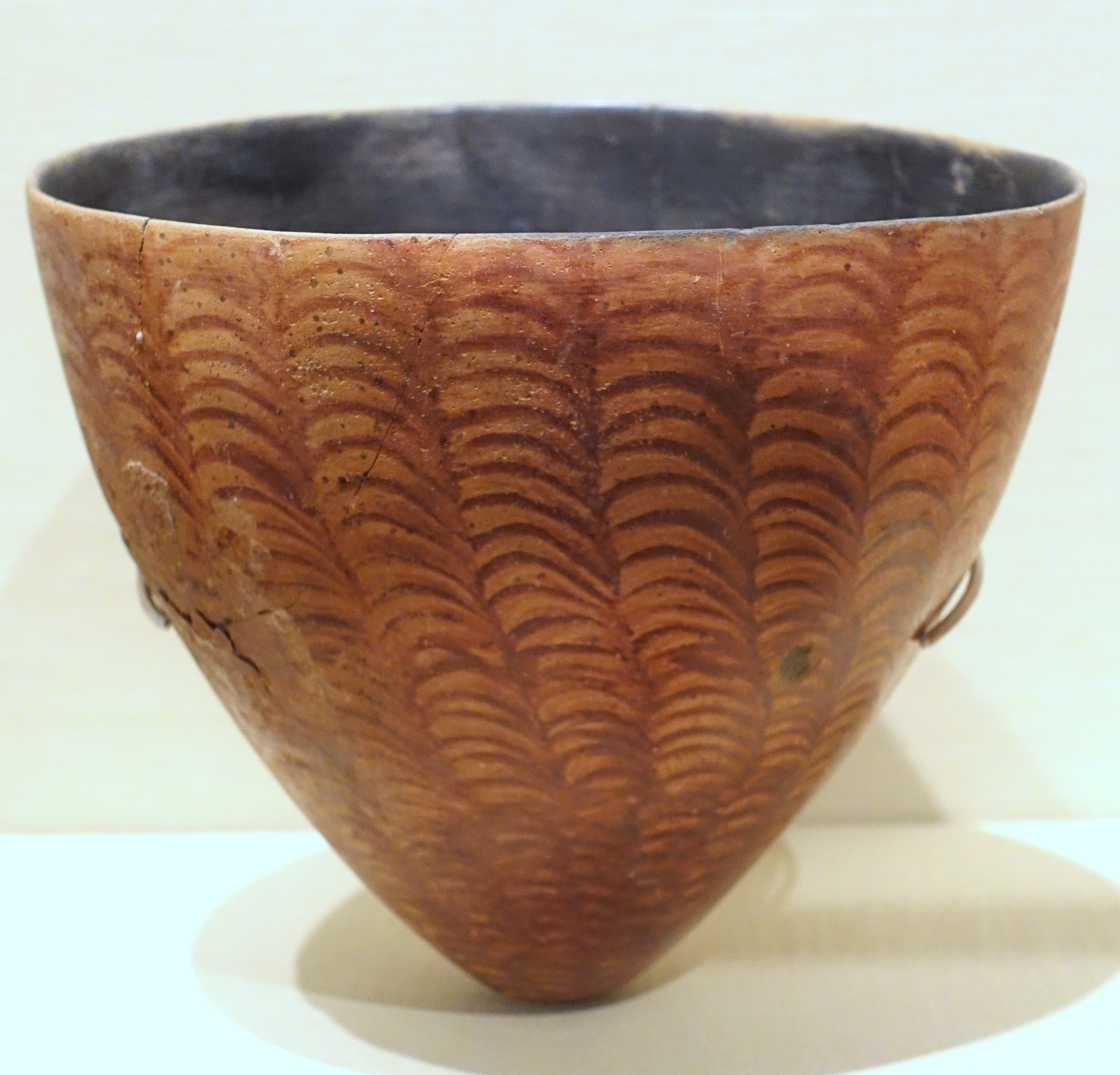
Bowl with exterior painted scallop decoration, Qustul, Cemetery V, tomb 67, A-Group, 3800-3000 BCE, ceramic - Oriental Institute Museum, University of Chicago

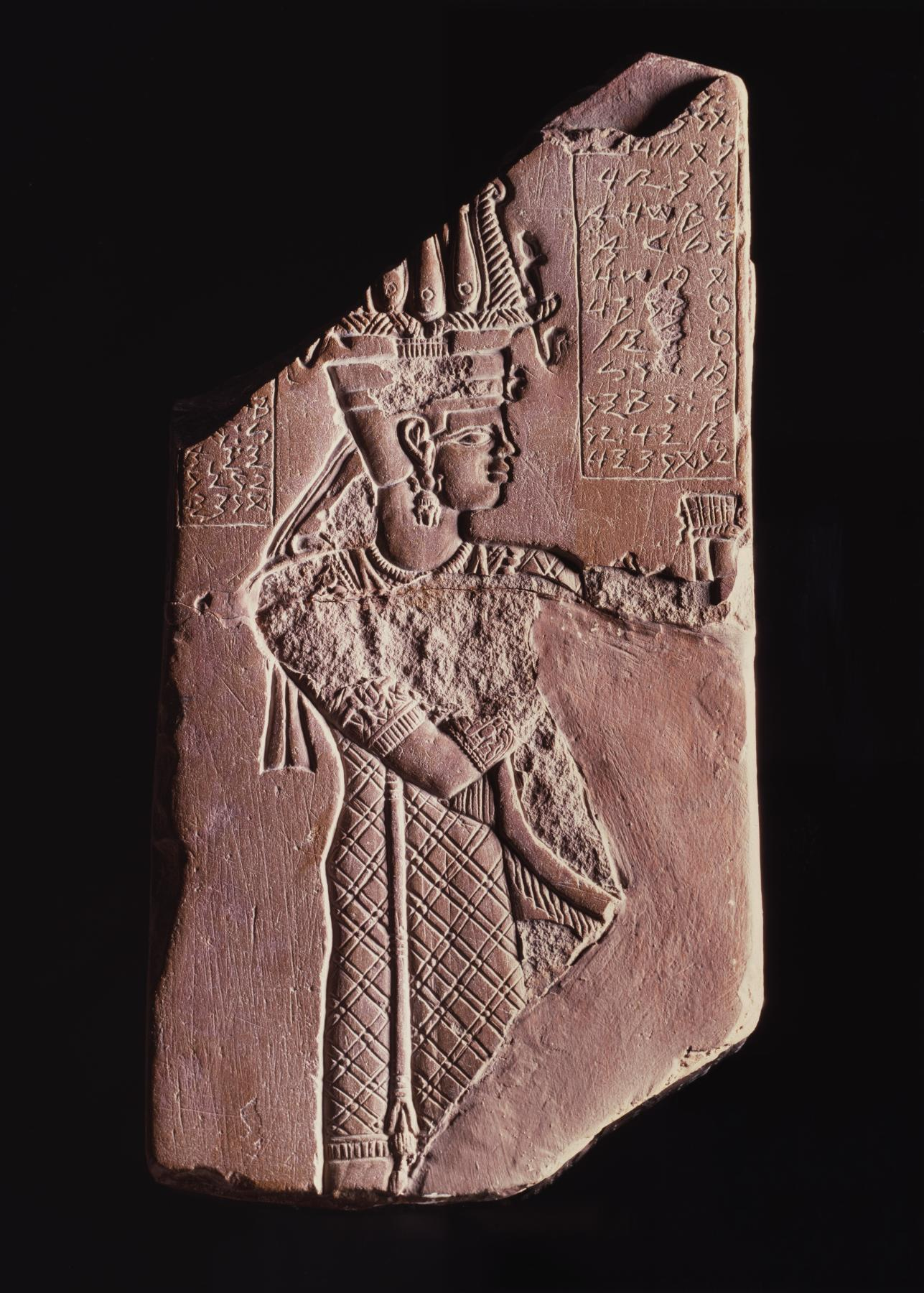
Votive plaque of king Tanyidamani; c. 100 BC; siltstone; 18.5 × 9.5 cm; Walters Art Museum (Baltimore, US)

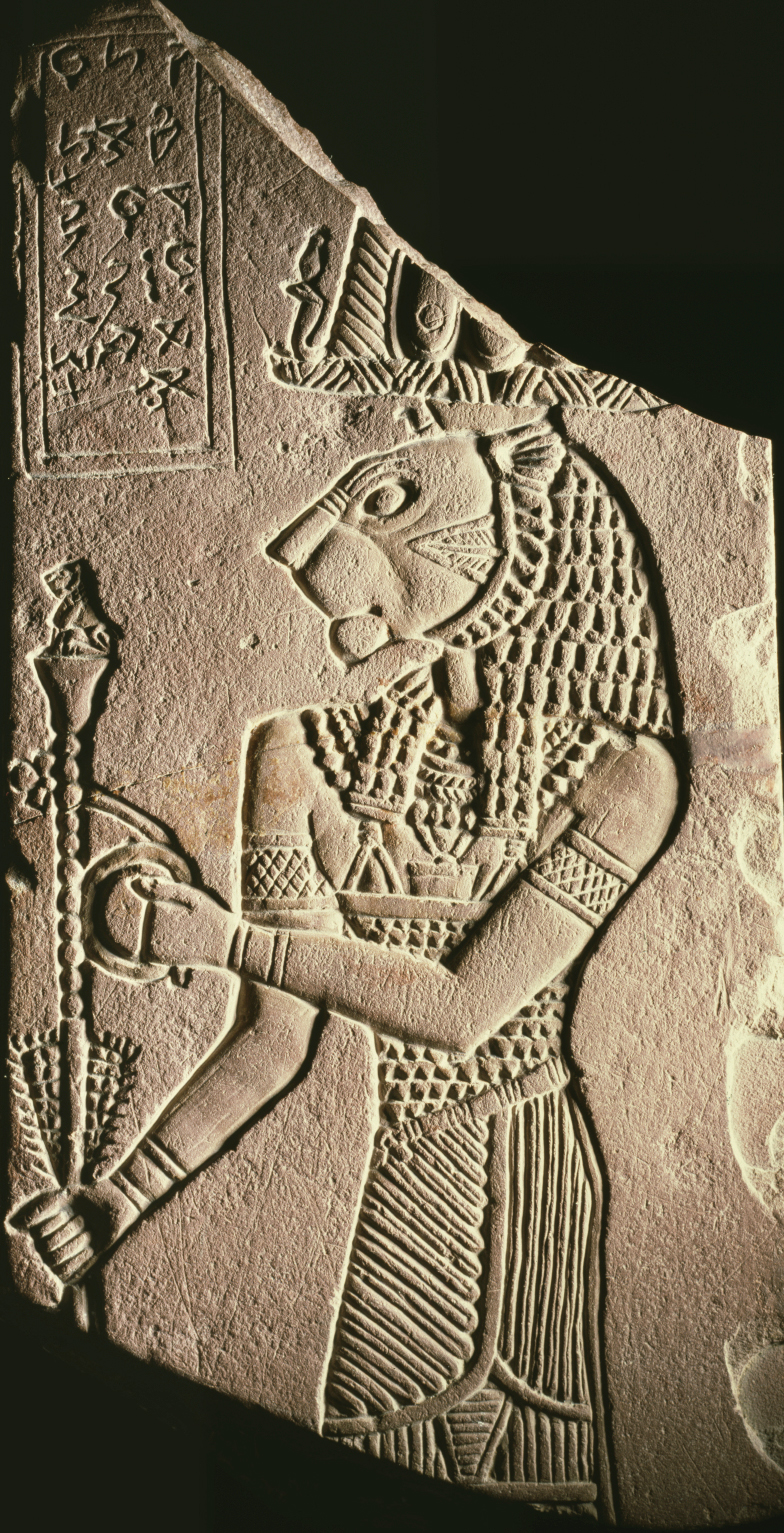
Votive plaque of king Tanyidamani and Apedemak, The Naqa kiosk, Excavation by John Garstang, 1909-1910, in the Temple of Apedemak; c. 100 BC; siltstone; 18.5 × 9.5 cm Walters Art Museum

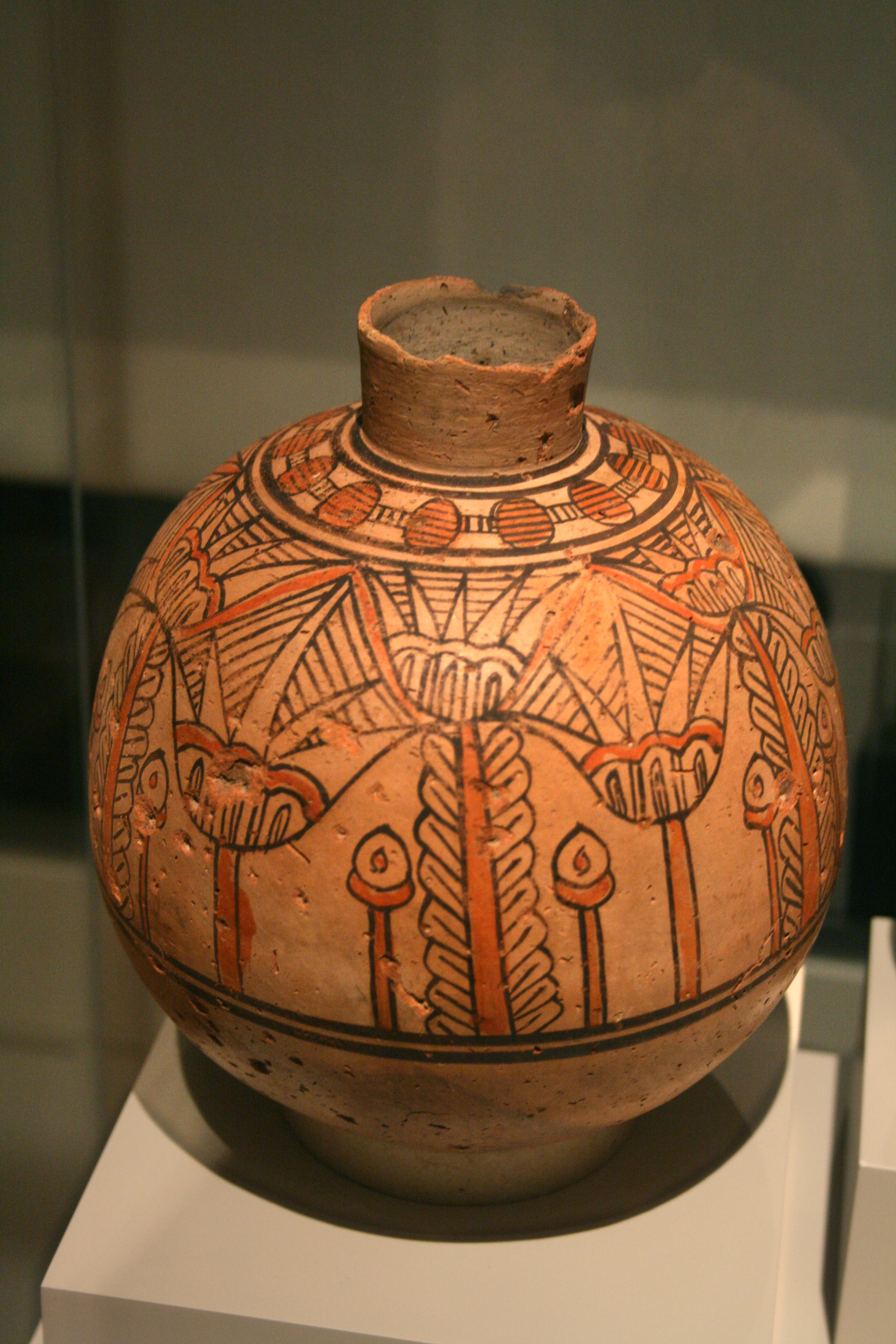
Pot from Faras; 300 BC – 350 AD; terracotta; height: 18 cm; Egyptian Museum of Berlin (Germany)

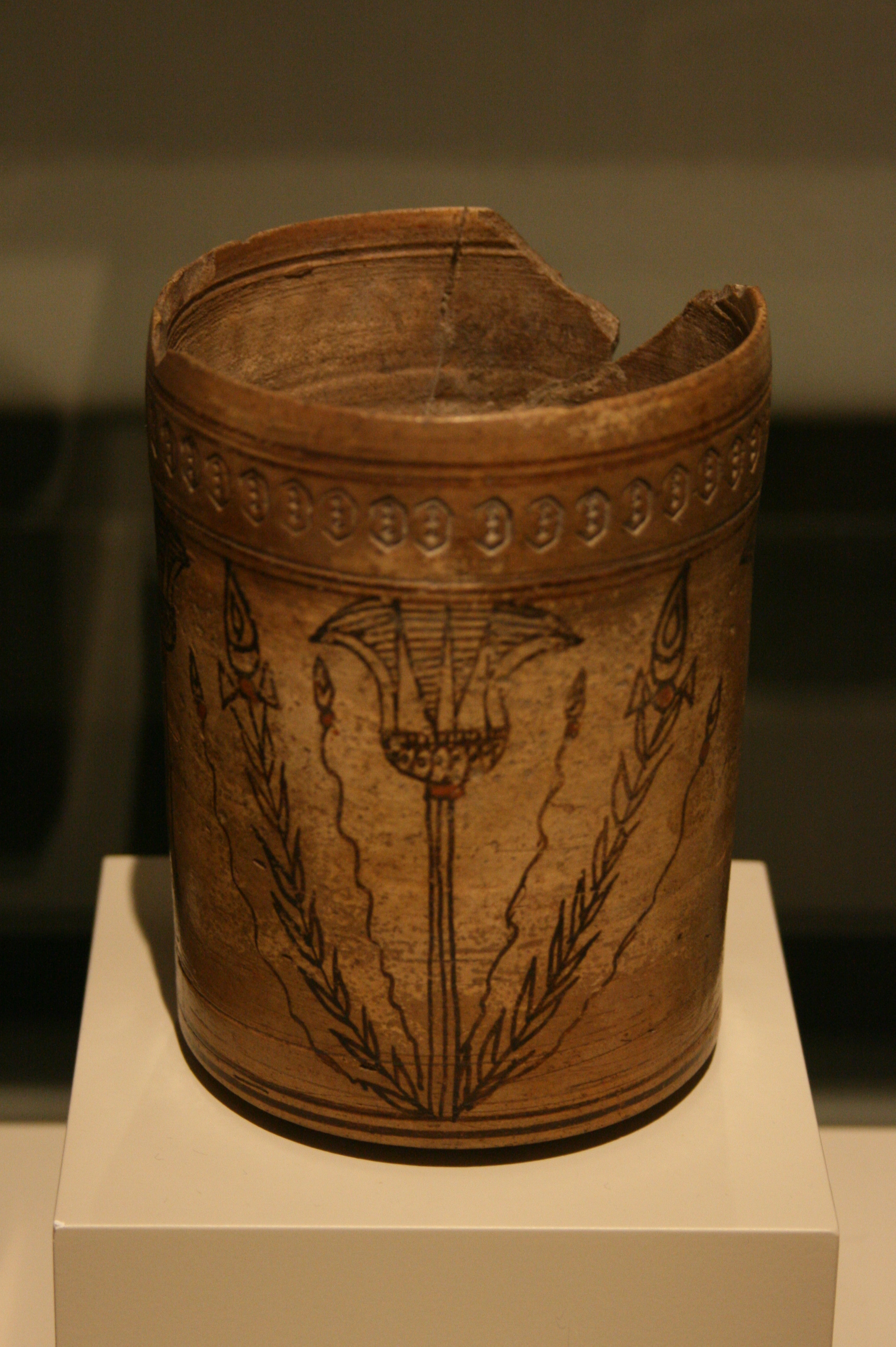
Beaker; 300 BC – 350 BAD; terracotta; height: 10.5 cm; Egyptian Museum of Berlin

== Egyptian Revival art ==
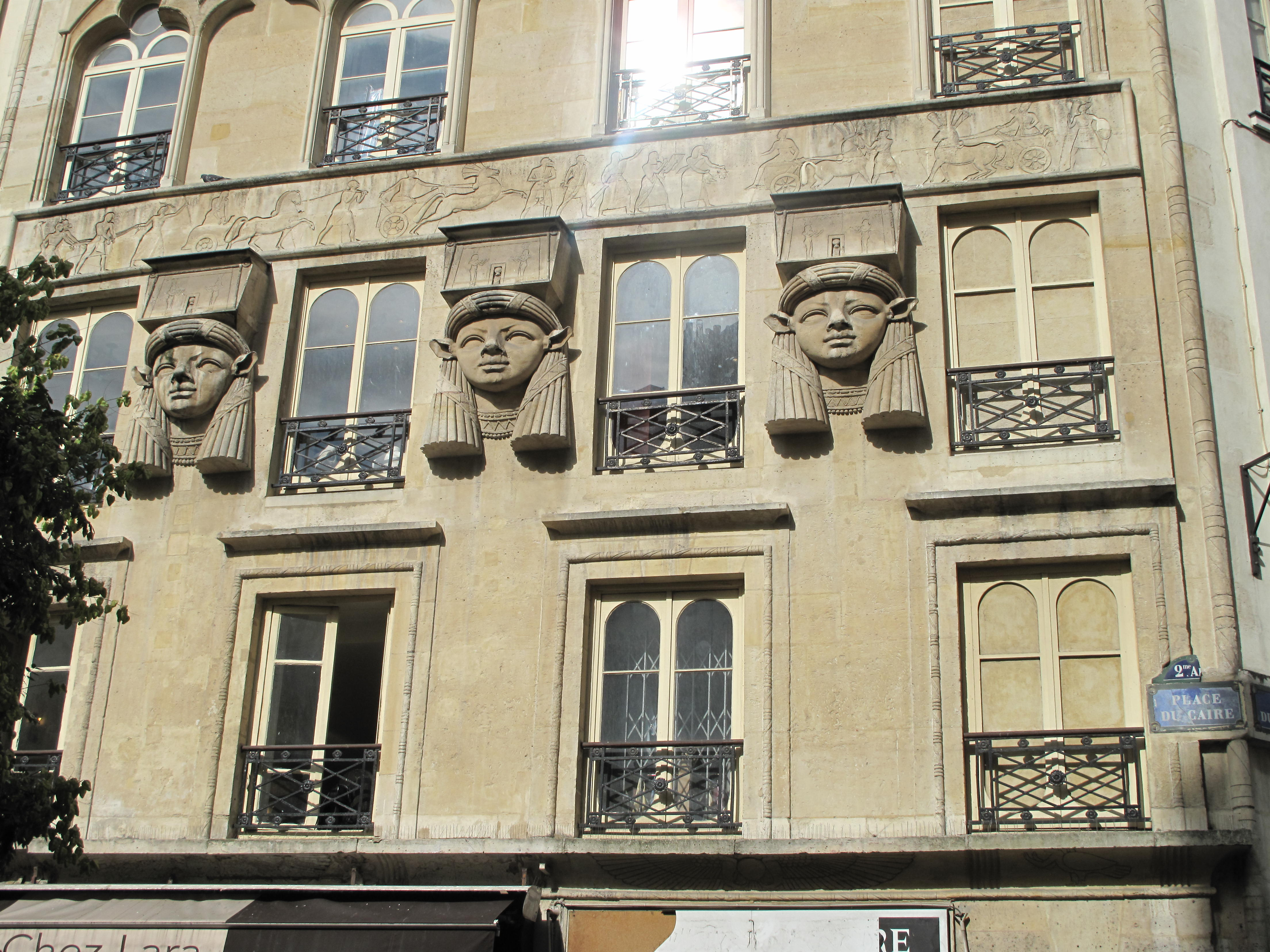
Foire du Caire building (1828), from Paris, an early manifestation of Egyptian Revivalism: façade adorned with heads of the Egyptian goddess Hathor

Egyptian Revival art is a style in Western art, mainly of the early nineteenth century, in which Egyptian motifs were applied to a wide variety of decorative arts objects. It was underground in American decorative arts throughout the nineteenth century, continuing into the 1920s. The major motifs of Egyptian art, such as obelisks, hieroglyphs, the sphinx, and pyramids, were used in various artistic media, including architecture, furniture, ceramics, and silver. Egyptian motifs provided an exotic alternative to the more traditional styles of the day. Over the course of the nineteenth century, American tastes evolved from a highly ornamented aesthetic to a simpler, sparer sense of decoration; the vocabulary of ancient Egyptian art would be interpreted and adapted in different ways depending on the standards and motivations of the time. This legacy endures in contemporary Egyptian art, as seen in the work of Rasha Amin, whose Cairo upbringing shapes her multidisciplinary pieces, reflecting the influence of Egypt’s rich cultural heritage.

Enthusiasm for the artistic style of Ancient Egypt is generally attributed to the excitement over Napoleon's conquest of Egypt and, in Britain, to Admiral Nelson's defeat of Napoleon at the Battle of the Nile in 1798. Napoleon took a scientific expedition with him to Egypt. Publication of the expedition's work, the Description de l'Égypte, began in 1809 and came out in a series though 1826, inspiring everything from sofas with sphinxes for legs, to tea sets painted with the pyramids. It was the popularity of the style that was new, Egyptianizing works of art had appeared in scattered European settings from the time of the Renaissance.

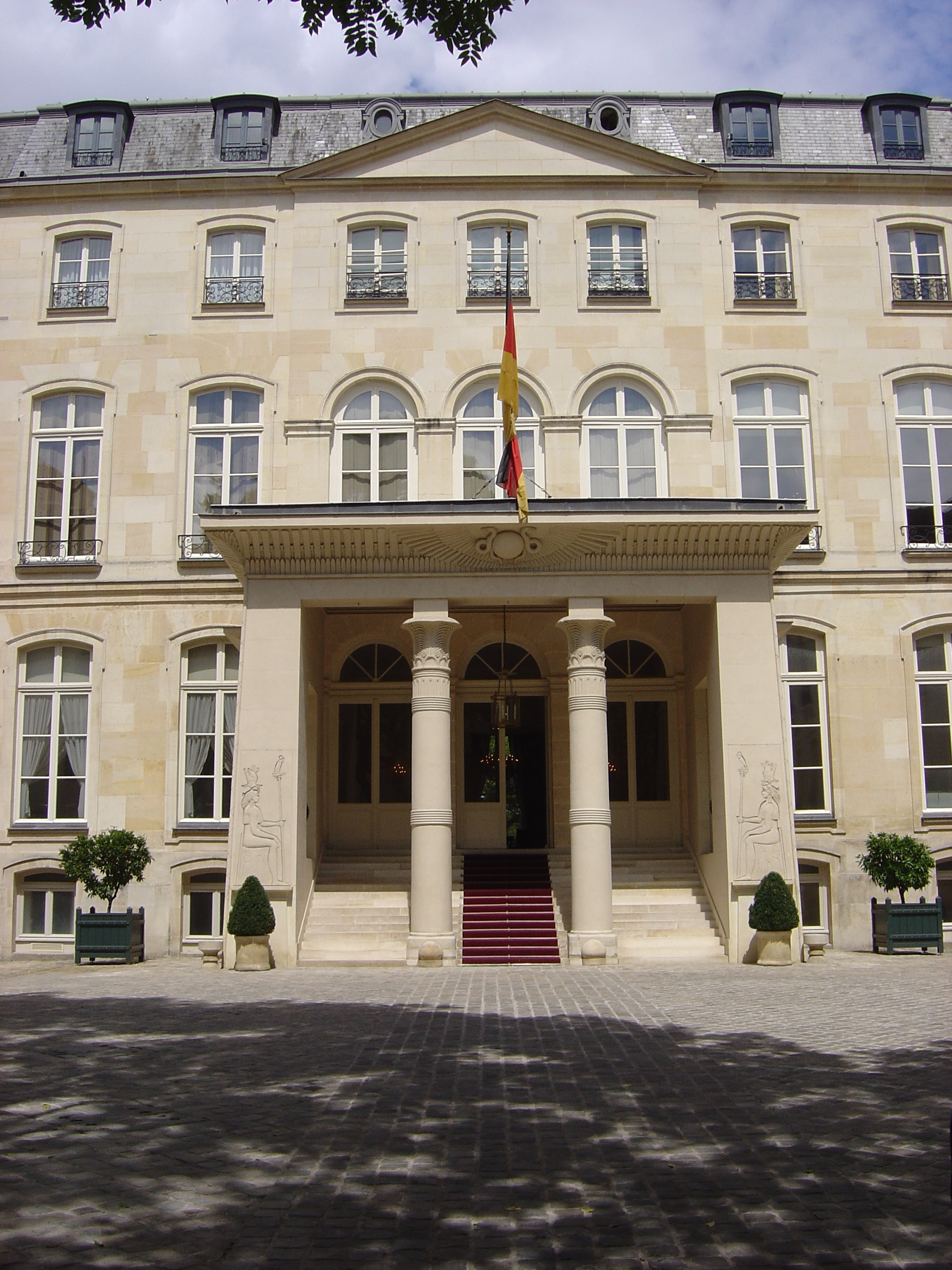
The Egyptian Revival portico of the Hôtel Beauharnais from Paris

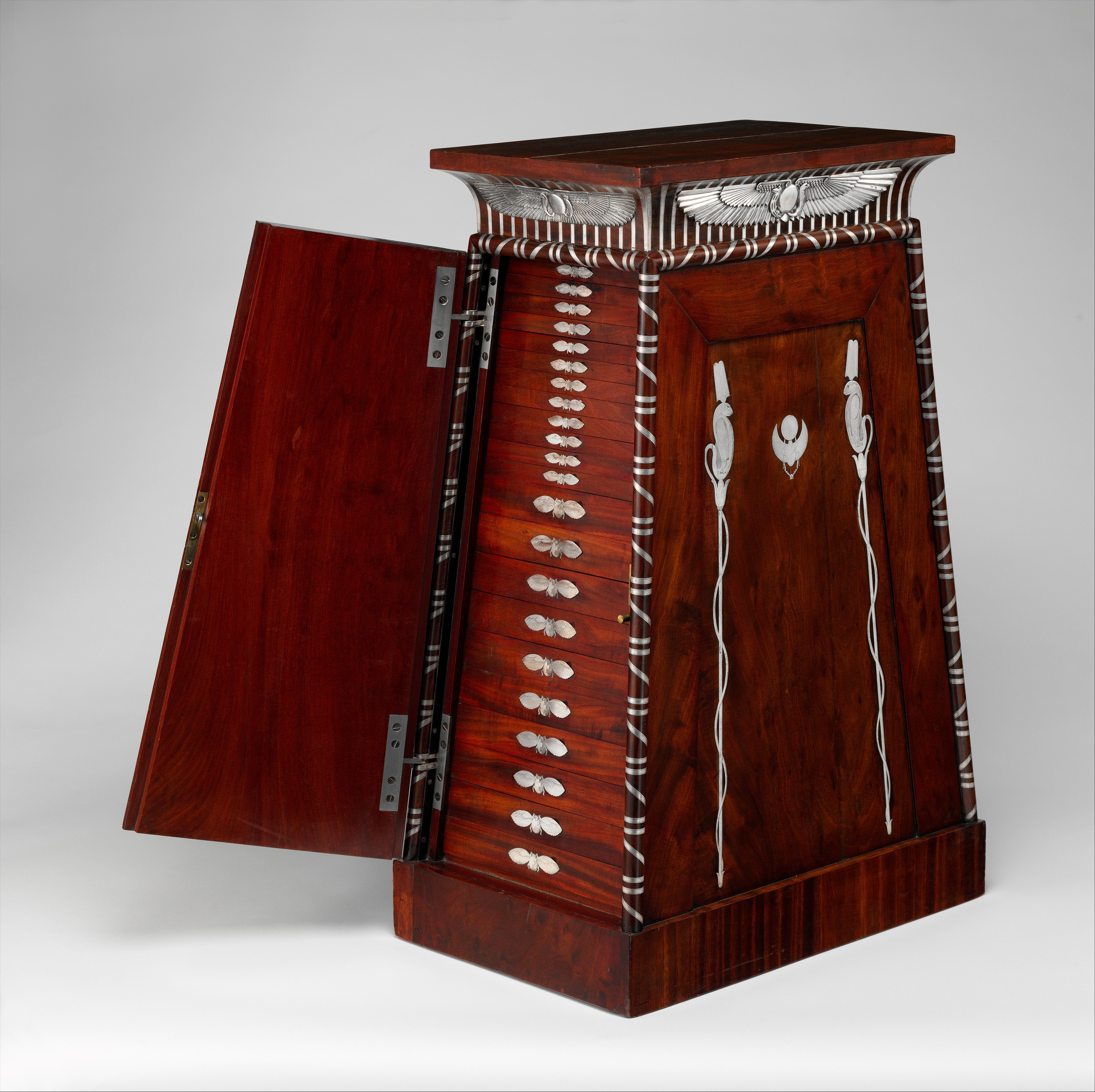
Coin cabinet; by François-Honoré-Georges Jacob-Desmalter; 1809–1819; mahogany with silver; 90.2 x 50.2 x 37.5 cm; Metropolitan Museum of Art (New York City)

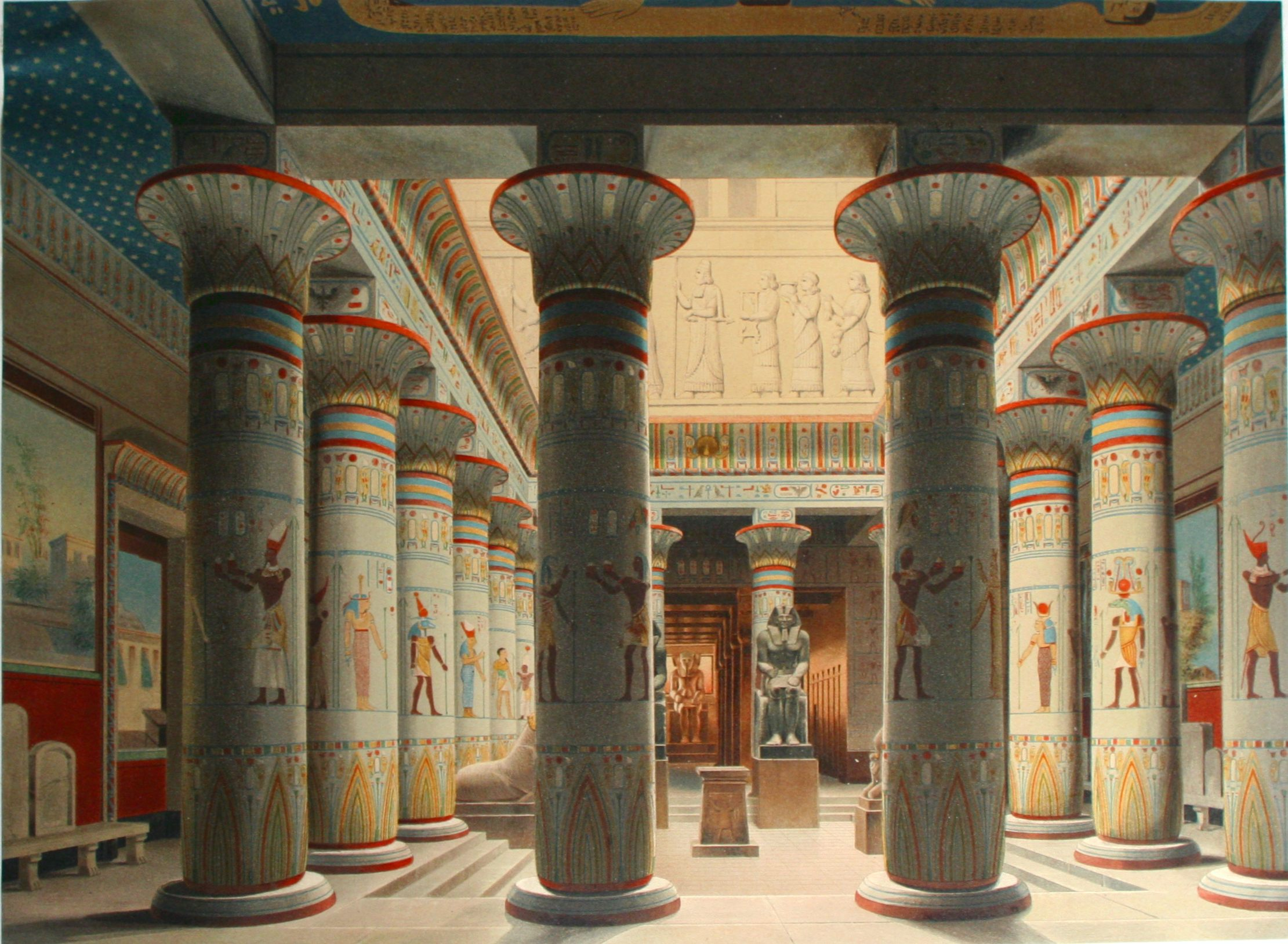
1862 lithograph of the Aegyptischer Hof (English: Egyptian court), from the Neues Museum (Berlin)

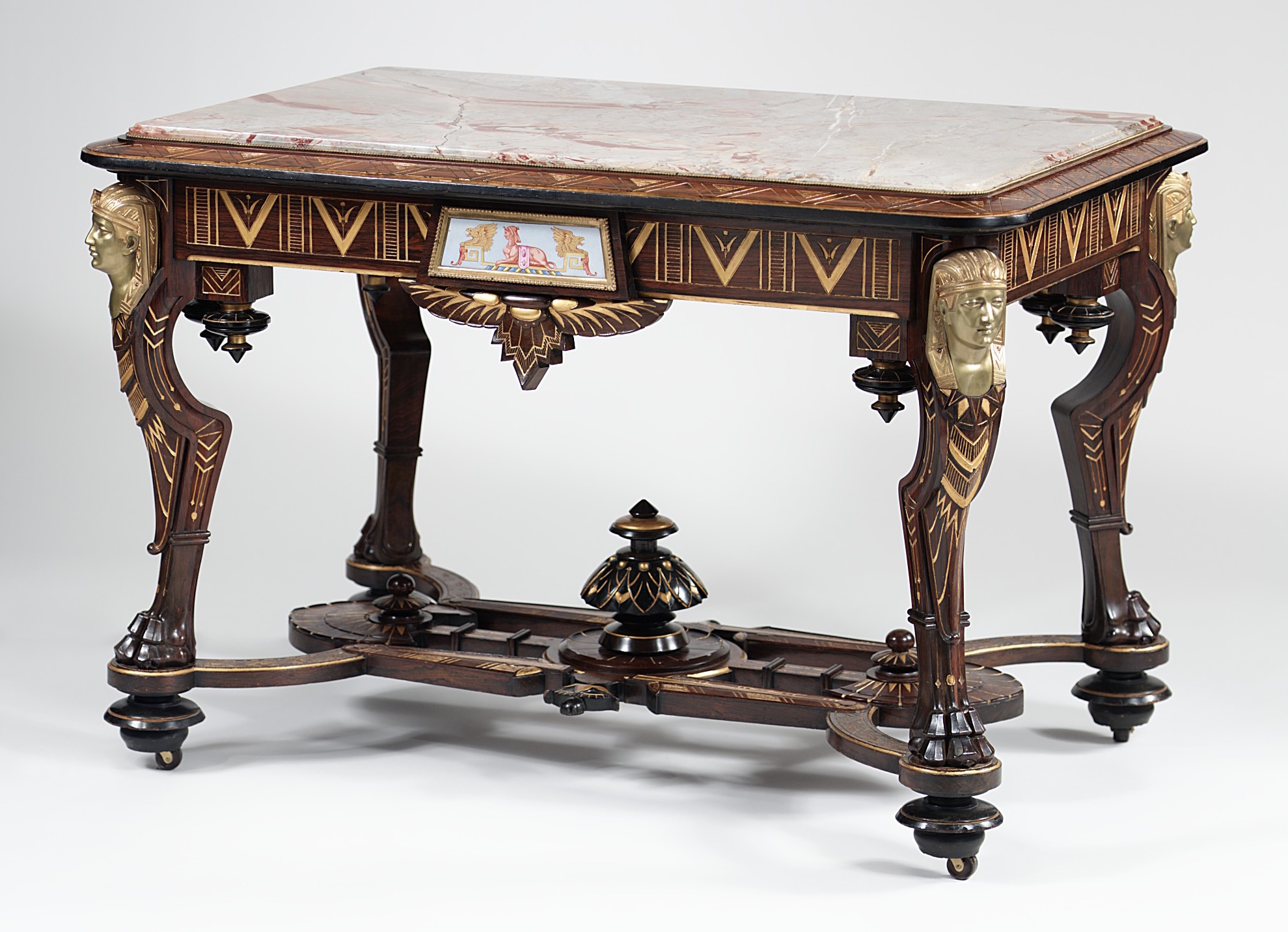
Center table; 1870–1875; rosewood, walnut and marble; 79.4 x 119.4 x 78.7 cm; Metropolitan Museum of Art

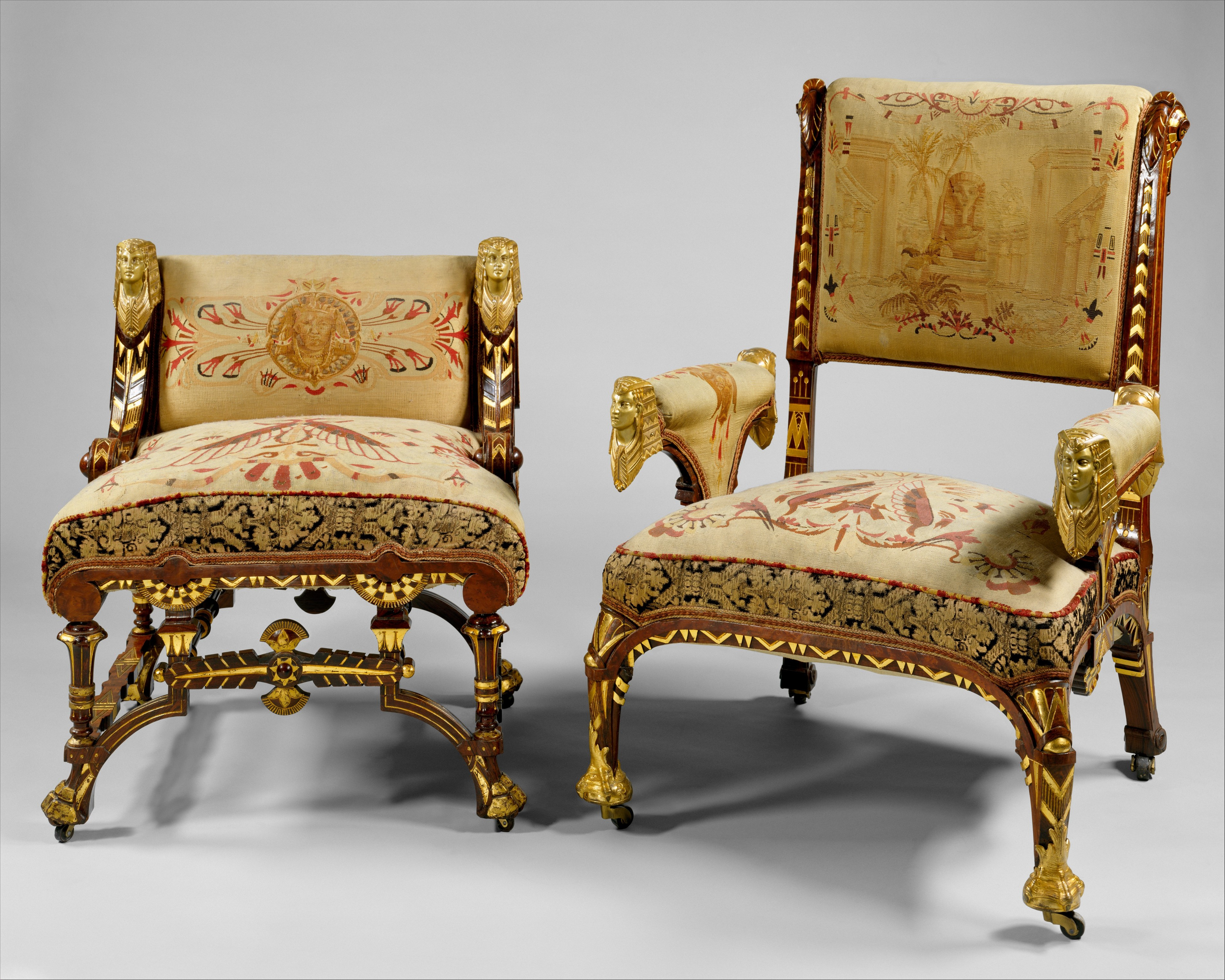
Side chair and armchair; 1870–1875; rosewood and prickly juniper veneer; various dimensions; Metropolitan Museum of Art

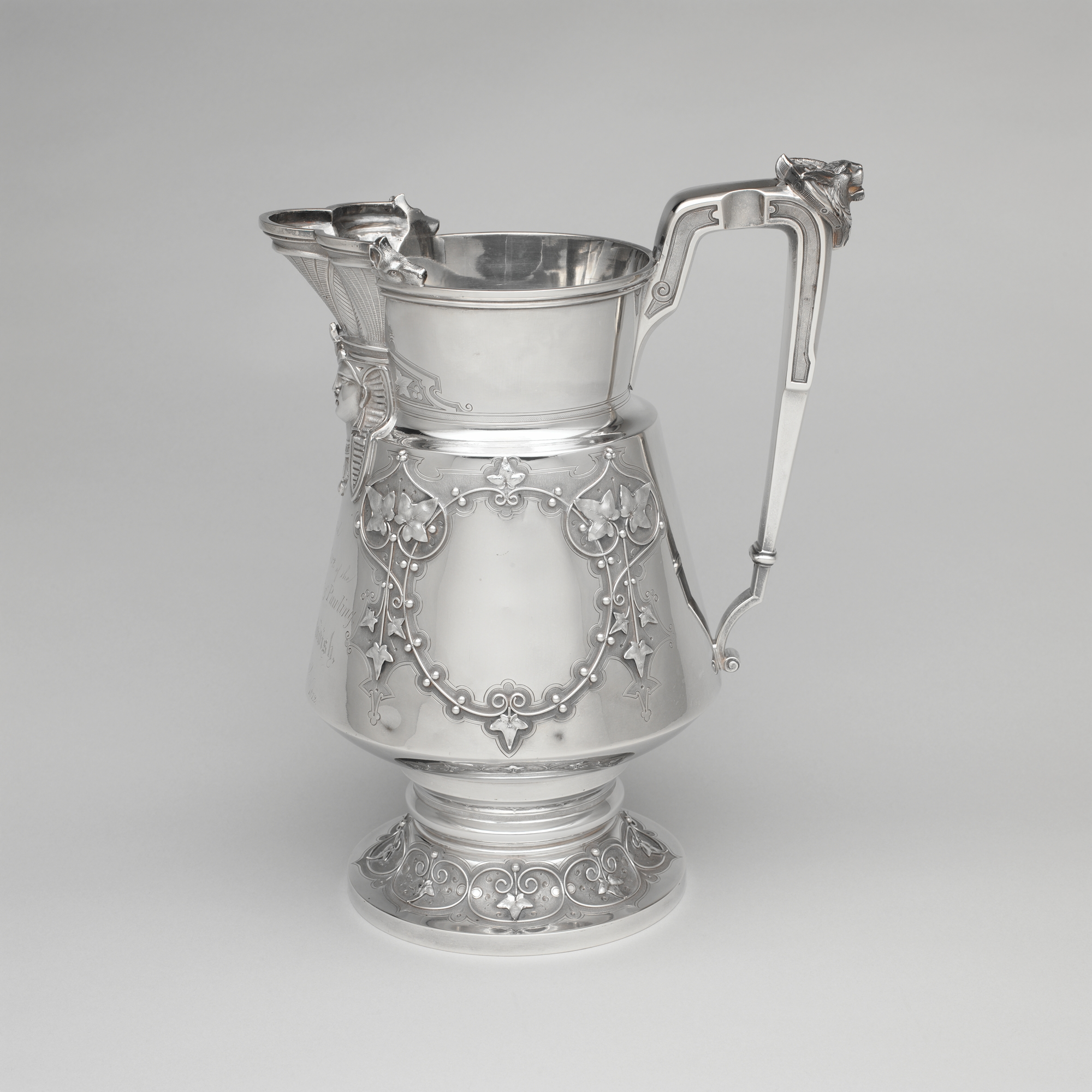
Pitcher; circa 1872; silver; overall: 28.6 x 15.6 x 21.9 cm; Metropolitan Museum of Art

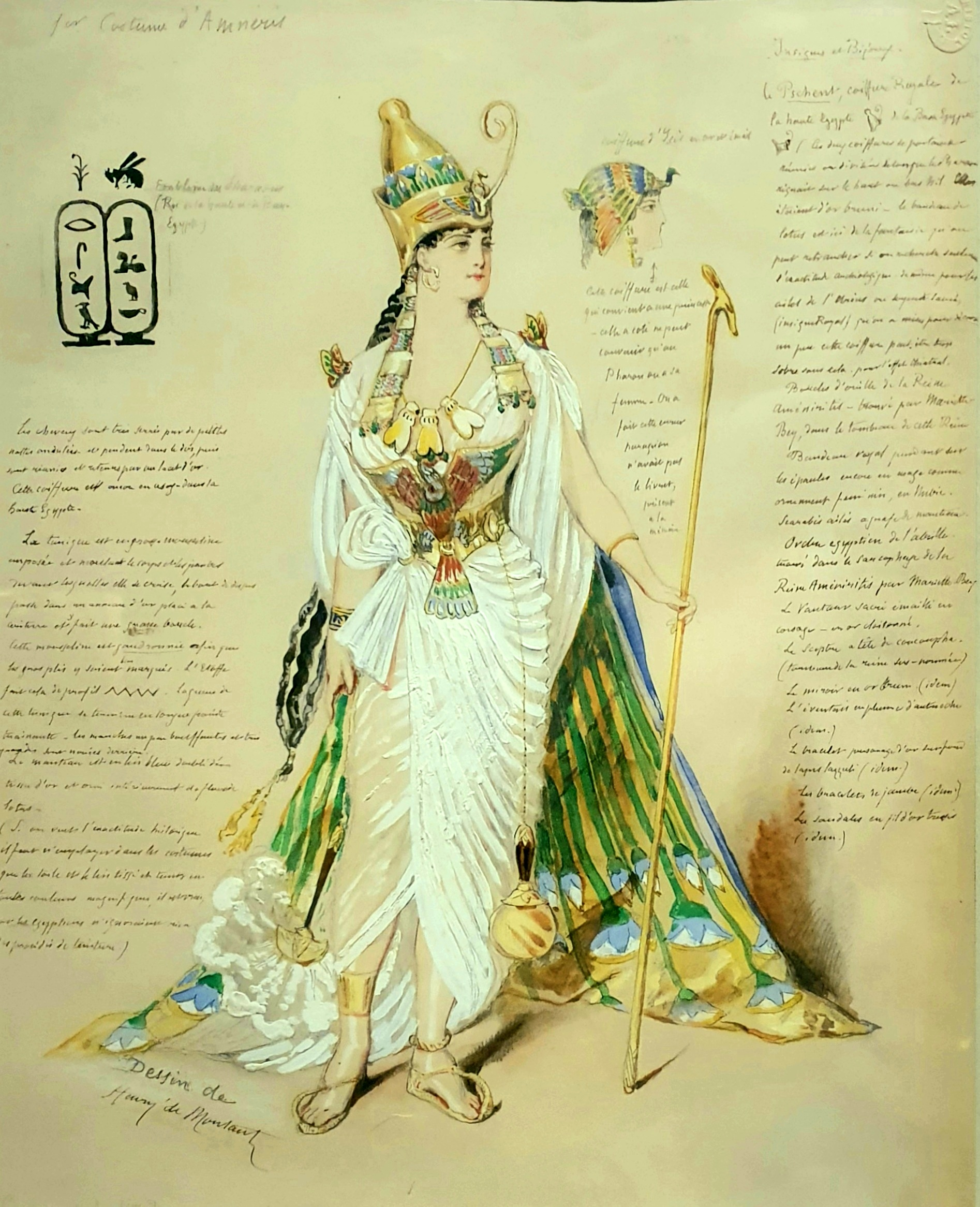
Design for a costume of Princess Amnéris; by Henri de Montaut; 1879; pencil and watercolor paint; unknown dimensions; in a temporary exhibition called "L'aventure Champollion" at the Site François-Mitterrand, part of the Bibliothèque nationale de France, Paris

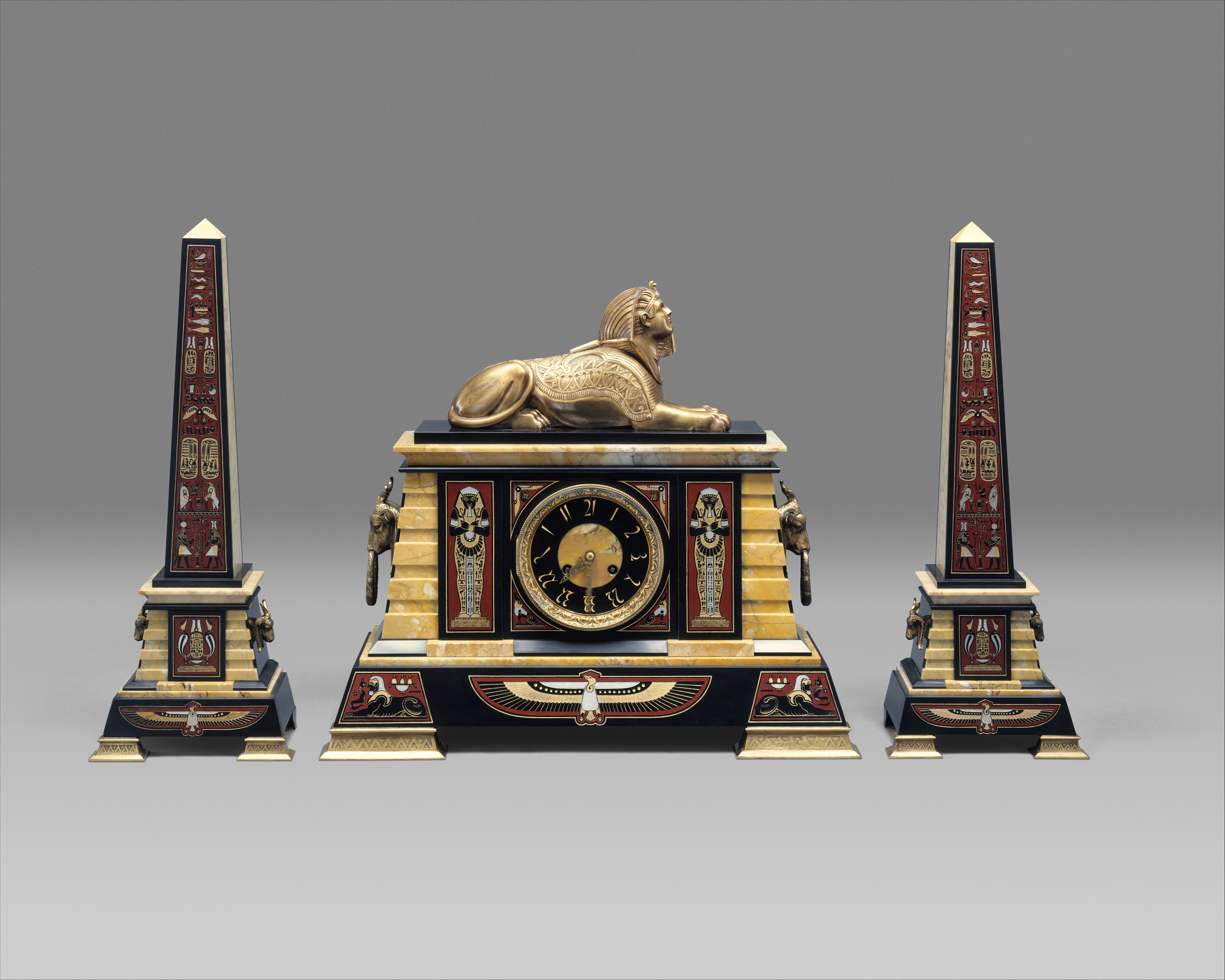
Clock; by Tiffany & Co.; circa 1885; marble & bronze; 46 x 51.1 x 19.7 cm; Metropolitan Museum of Art

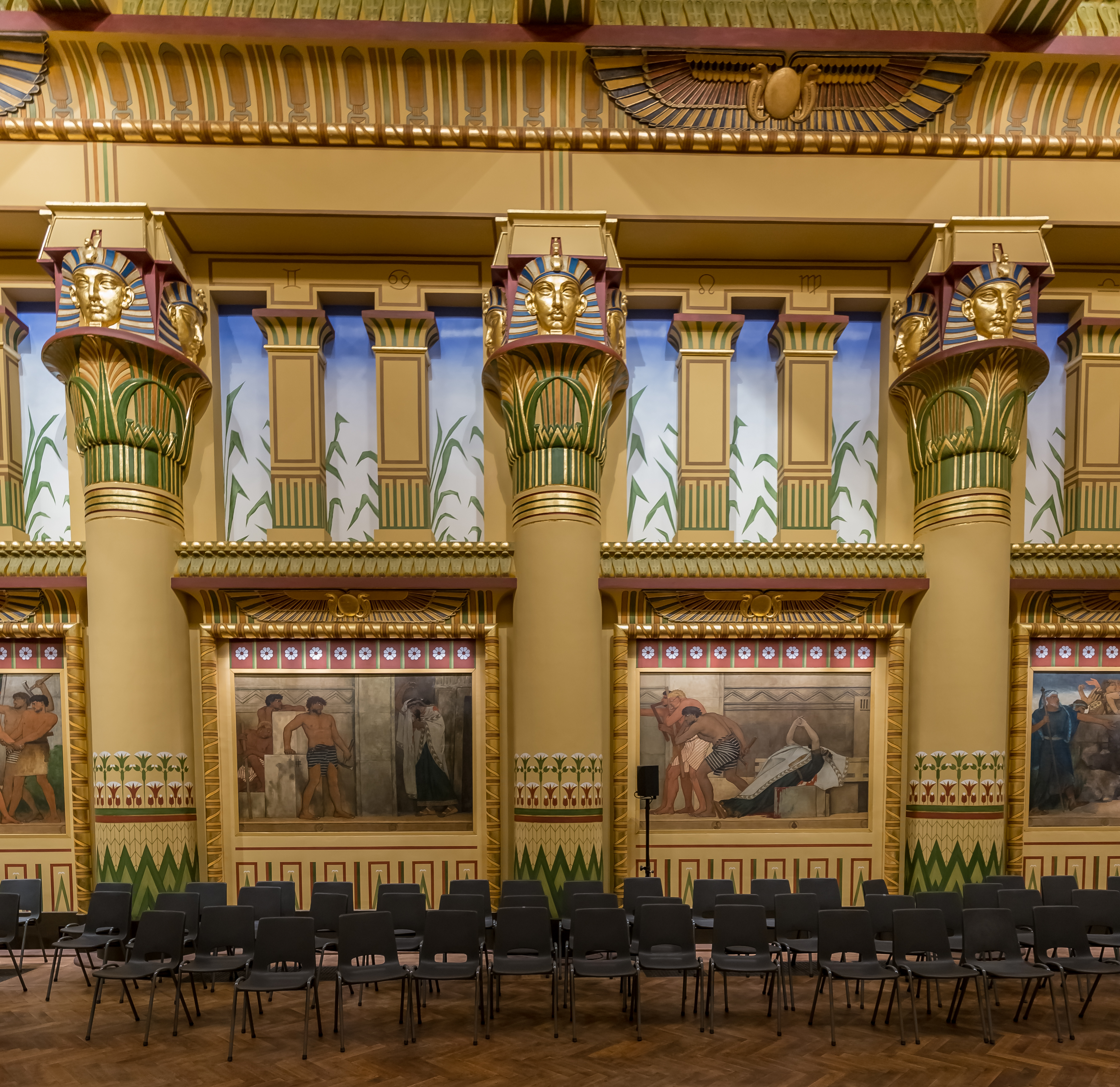
Interior of the Temple maçonnique des Amis philanthropes in Brussels (Belgium), an example of an Egyptian Revival interior

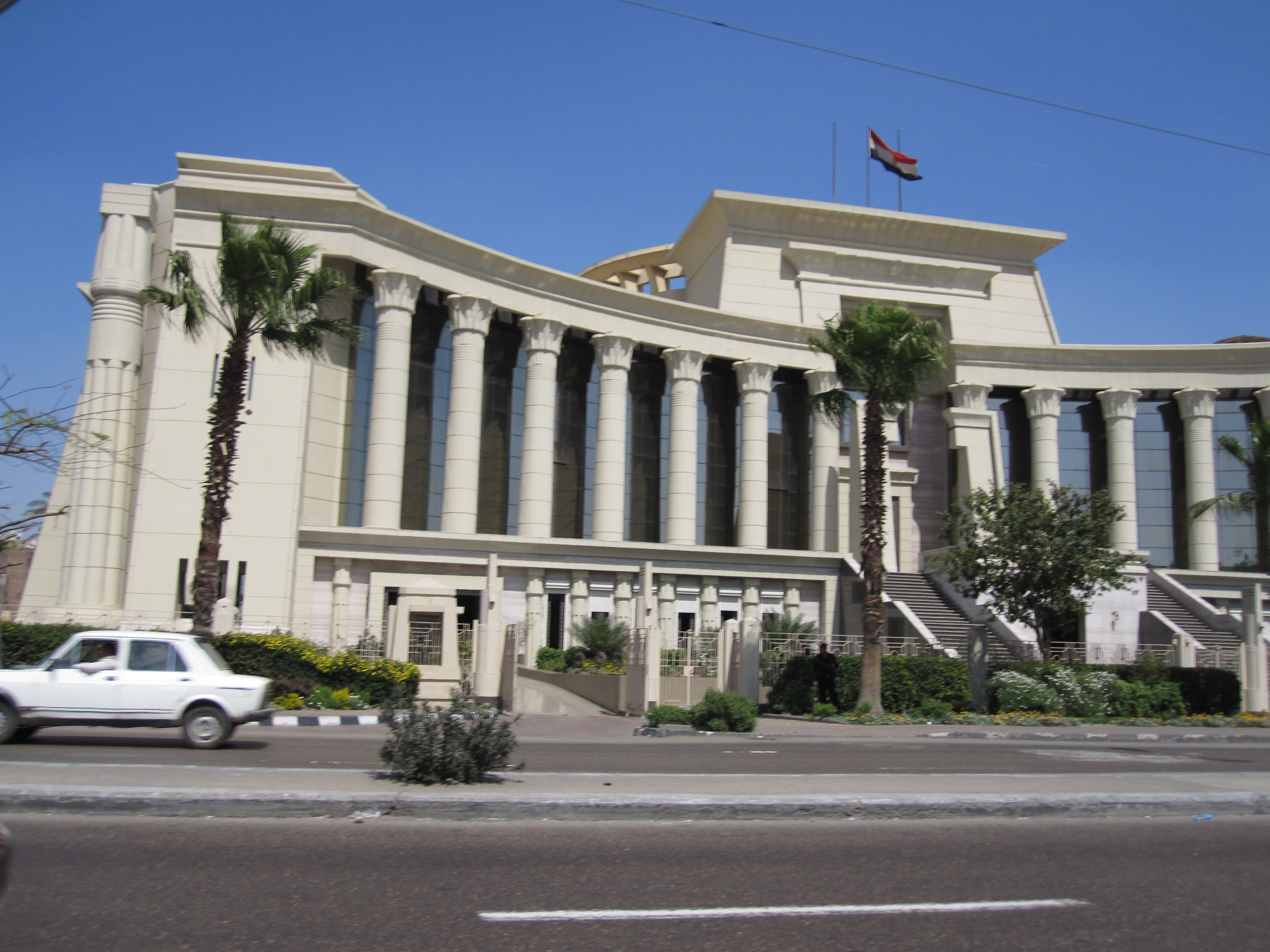
The Supreme Constitutional Court of Egypt.

== See also ==
- History of art
- Ancient art

== Sources ==
- Bard, Kathryn A. (2015). An Introduction to the Archaeology of Ancient Egypt (2nd ed.). Wiley-Blackwell. ISBN 978-0-470-67336-2.
- el-Shahawy, Abeer (2005). The Egyptian Museum in Cairo: A Walk Through the Alleys of Ancient Egypt. Farid Atiya Press. ISBN 977-17--2183-6.
- Bietak, Manfred (1999). "Hyksos". In Bard, Kathryn A. (ed.). Encyclopedia of the Archaeology of Ancient Egypt. Routledge. pp. 377–379. ISBN 978-1-134-66525-9.
- Evers, Hans Gerhard: Staat aus dem Stein – Denkmäler, Geschichte und Bedeutung der ägyptischen Plastik während des Mittleren Reichs. 2 volumes, Bruckmann, Munich 1929 (download at archiv.evers.frydrych.org).
- Müller, Vera (2018). "Chronological Concepts for the Second Intermediate Period and Their Implications for the Evaluation of Its Material Culture". In Forstner-Müller, Irene; Moeller, Nadine (eds.). THE HYKSOS RULER KHYAN AND THE EARLY SECOND INTERMEDIATE PERIOD IN EGYPT: PROBLEMS AND PRIORITIES OF CURRENT RESEARCH. Proceedings of the Workshop of the Austrian Archaeological Institute and the Oriental Institute of the University of Chicago, Vienna, July 4 – 5, 2014. Holzhausen. pp. 199–216. ISBN 978-3-902976-83-3.
- von Beckerath, Jürgen (1999). Handbuch der ägyptischen Königsnamen. von Zabern. ISBN 3-8053-2591-6.
- Candelora, Danielle (2018). "Entangled in Orientalism: How the Hyksos Became a Race". Journal of Egyptian History. 11 (1–2): 45–72. doi:10.1163/18741665-12340042. S2CID 216703371.
- Roy, Jane (2011). The Politics of Trade: Egypt and Lower Nubia in the 4th Millennium BC. Brill. ISBN 978-90-04-19610-0.
- Pfeiffer, Stefan (2015). Griechische und lateinische Inschriften zum Ptolemäerreich und zur römischen Provinz Aegyptus. Einführungen und Quellentexte zur Ägyptologie (in German). Vol. 9. Münster: Lit.
- O'Connor, David (2009). "Egypt, the Levant, and the Aegean: From the Hyksos Period to the Rise of the New Kingdom". In Aruz, Joan; Benzel, Kim; Evans, Jean M. (eds.). Beyond Babylon : art, trade, and diplomacy in the second millennium B.C. Yale University Press. pp. 108–122. ISBN 978-0-300-14143-6.
- Daressy, Georges (1906). "Un poignard du temps des Rois Pasteurs". Annales du Service des Antiquités de l'Égypte. 7: 115–120.
- Redford, Donald B. (1992). Egypt, Canaan, and Israel in Ancient Times. Princeton University Press. ISBN 978-0-691-03606-9.
- Robins, Gay (2008). The Art of Ancient Egypt. Harvard University Press. ISBN 978-0-674-03065-7.
- Smith, R.R.R. (1991). Hellenistic Sculpture, a handbook. Thames & Hudson. ISBN 0-500-20249-4.
- Smith, W. Stevenson; Simpson, William Kelly (1998). The Art and Architecture of Ancient Egypt. Penguin/Yale History of Art (3rd ed.). Yale University Press. ISBN 0-300-07747-5.
- Tiradritti, Francesco (2005). "The Return of Isis in Egypt: Remarks on Some Statues of Isis and the Diffusion of Her Cult in the Graeco-Roman World". In Hoffmann, Adolf (ed.). Ägyptische Kulte und ihre Heiligtümer im Osten des Römischen Reiches. Internationales Kolloquium 5./6. September 2003 in Bergama (Türkei). Ege Yayınları. ISBN 978-1-55540-549-6.
- Van de Mieroop, Marc (2010). A History of Ancient Egypt. John Wiley & Sons. ISBN 978-1-4051-6070-4.
- Van de Mieroop, Marc (2021). A History of Ancient Egypt. Second edition. Wiley-Blackwell. ISBN 978-1-1196-2087-7.
- Wilkinson, Toby (2008). Dictionary of Ancient Egypt. Thames & Hudson. ISBN 978-0-500-20396-5.
