= Pudjammeret =

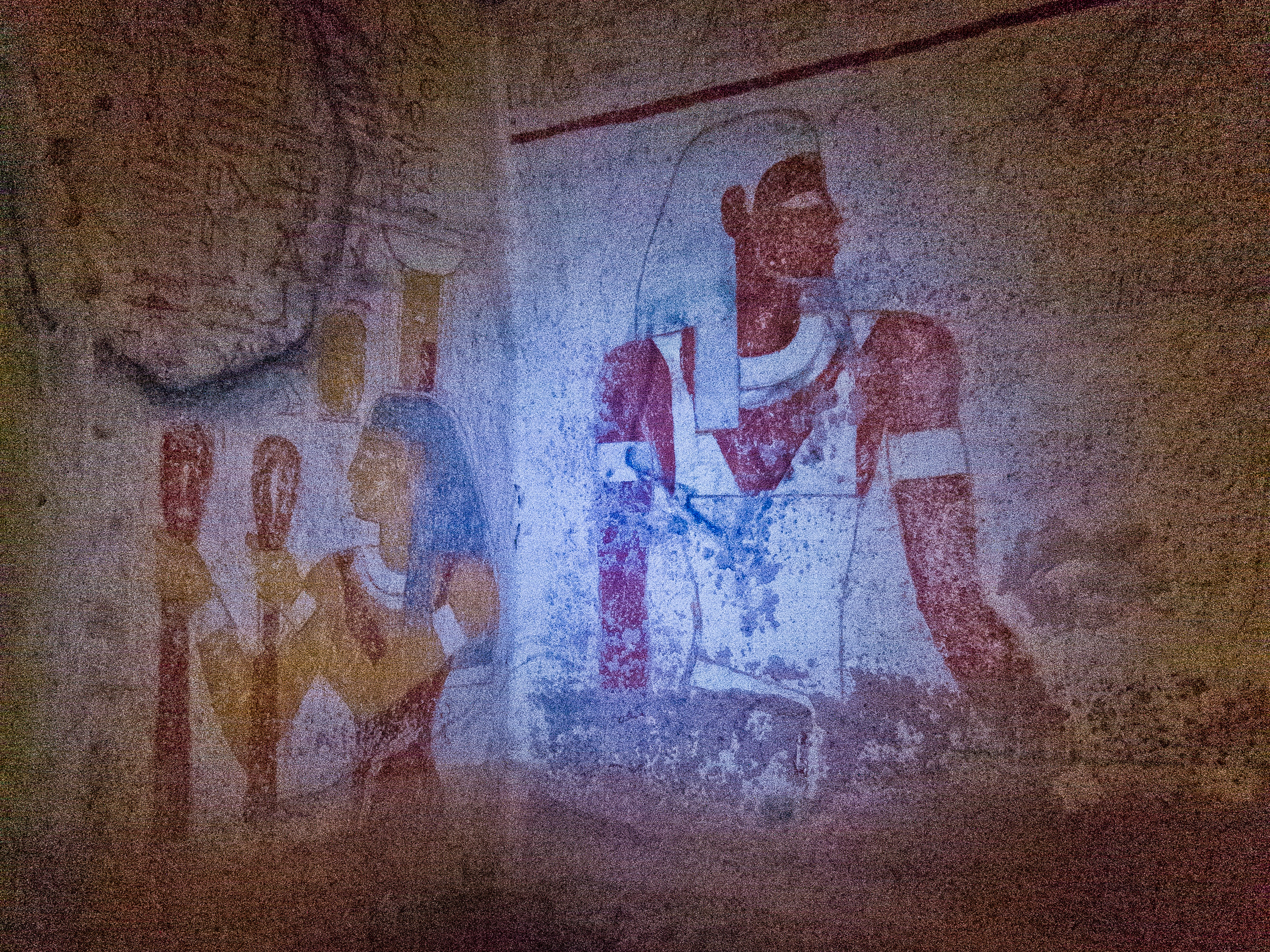
Inside Ancient Nubian Tomb at El-Kurru. This isn't exact tomb of Queen Pudjammeret but provides insight into burial practices and artistic representations of royal women during Napatan period.

Pudjammeret (also spelled Pudjammer or Pudjammeret) was a royal woman of the Kingdom of Kush, likely from early Napatan period in ancient Nubia (modern-day Sudan), during the 8th to 7th century BCE. Her name is preserved through funerary inscriptions and archaeological remains at royal cemetery of El-Kurru, one of the earliest burial grounds used by the Napatan Dynasty.

== Historical context ==
Pudjammeret lived during a time when the Kingdom of Kush was consolidating power in Nubia following the decline of the New Kingdom of Egypt. The early Napatan rulers, beginning with Alara and followed by kings such as Kashta and Piye, established a royal lineage that would later come to rule Egypt as the 25th Dynasty. El-Kurru, where Pudjammeret was buried, served as the dynastic necropolis for these early Kushite kings and queens.

=== Burial at El-Kurru ===
Pudjammeret was buried in Tomb K.6 at El-Kurru. Archaeological excavations led by George Reisner and later detailed by Dows Dunham revealed that her tomb included shabtis bearing her name and funerary goods consistent with high-status royal women of the period. Although the full extent of her political role remains unclear, the scale and form of her burial suggest she held a position of considerable importance, possibly as a queen consort or queen mother.

=== Status and interpretation ===
While her precise relationship to the Kushite kings is not definitively known, scholars suggest she may have been a wife or sister of one of the early Napatan Rulers, possibly Kashta or Piye. Her inclusion in the El-Kurru cemetery and the royal nature of her tomb underscore the prominence of elite women in Napatan Society, especially within the context of matrilineal succession and queenly authority.

=== Legacy ===
Pudjammeret is one of several royal women from ancient Nubia whose legacy is gradually being reconstructed through archaeology. Her tomb contributes to understanding early Kushite funerary customs, gender roles in royal succession, and religious and political authority exercised by queens in Ancient Sudan.

=== Visual documentation ===
While specific images of Pudjammeret's tomb or inscriptions are scarce online, the tomb of Qalhata, another Kushite queen and mother of King Tanwetamani, provides insight into the burial practices and artistic representations of royal women during the Napatan period. The tomb of Qalhata is part of the royal cemetery at El-Kurru and features wall paintings and inscriptions that reflects roles of Kushite queens.
