= Malaqaye =

Nubian queen

< mA rw q i >
Malaqaye
in hieroglyphs
Era: 3rd Intermediate Period
(1069–664 BC)

Malaqaye was a Nubian queen with the title king's wife. Her husband was presumed to have been Tantamani. So far she is only known from her burial at Nuri (Nu. 59).

At one time, her burial at Nuri most likely consisted of a pyramid with a chapel and two underground burial chambers. When excavated, the pyramid and chapel were completely gone. There was a staircase going underground leading to two burial chambers that were found to be looted, but still contained substantial part of the original equipment, including a silver mummy mask, many mummy coverings in silverm, and many amulets. The name of the queen was preserved on a heart scarab. Fragments of more than 100 uninscribed shabtis were also found.
