= Naparaye =

- Queen consort of Nubia and Egypt; King's Wife, King's Sister, etc
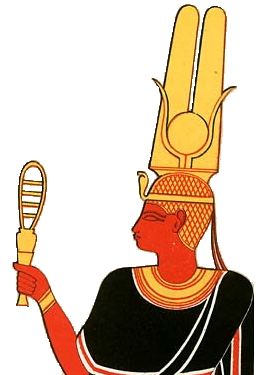
- Nubian queen from the Napatan period
- Burial: Pyramid at El-Kurru (Ku. 3)
- Spouse: Pharaoh Taharqa
- Dynasty: 25th Dynasty of Egypt
- Father: Piye
- Mother: unknown

< M22 M22 p r i i >
Naparaye
in hieroglyphs
Era: 3rd Intermediate Period
(1069–664 BC)

Naparaye was a Nubian queen dated to the Twenty-fifth Dynasty of Egypt.

Naparaye was the daughter of King Piye and the sister-wife of King Taharqa.

She held several titles: Great of Grace (wrt im3t), Great of Praises (wrt hzwt), Sweet of Love (bnrt mrwt), (Great?) King's Wife (hmt niswt (wrt?)), Lady of the Two Lands (hnwt t3wy), and King's Sister (snt niswt).

Naparaye's name is known from her tomb in el-Kurru (Ku. 3). At her pyramid an alabaster offering table was found (Khartoum, No. 191).
