= Arty (queen) =

- Queen consort of Nubia and Egypt; Royal Wife
- Burial: Ku. 6 in El-Kurru
- Spouse: Pharaoh Shebitku
- Dynasty: 25th Dynasty of Egypt
- Father: King Piye

r Z1 V13 i i B1
Arty
in hieroglyphs
Era: 3rd Intermediate Period
(1069–664 BC)

Arty was a Nubian King's wife dated to the Twenty-fifth Dynasty of Egypt.

Arty was a daughter of King Piye, the founder of the 25th dynasty, and was the wife of Shebitku. She is known from Cairo Statue 49157 from Karnak. Her name is mentioned on the base of a statue of Haremakhet.

She was buried in the necropolis at El-Kurru, in tomb Ku.6. The primary burial site for the early kings of the 25th Dynasty and their queens.
