= Tantamani =

Egyptian pharaoh of the 25th dynasty

Tanwetamani
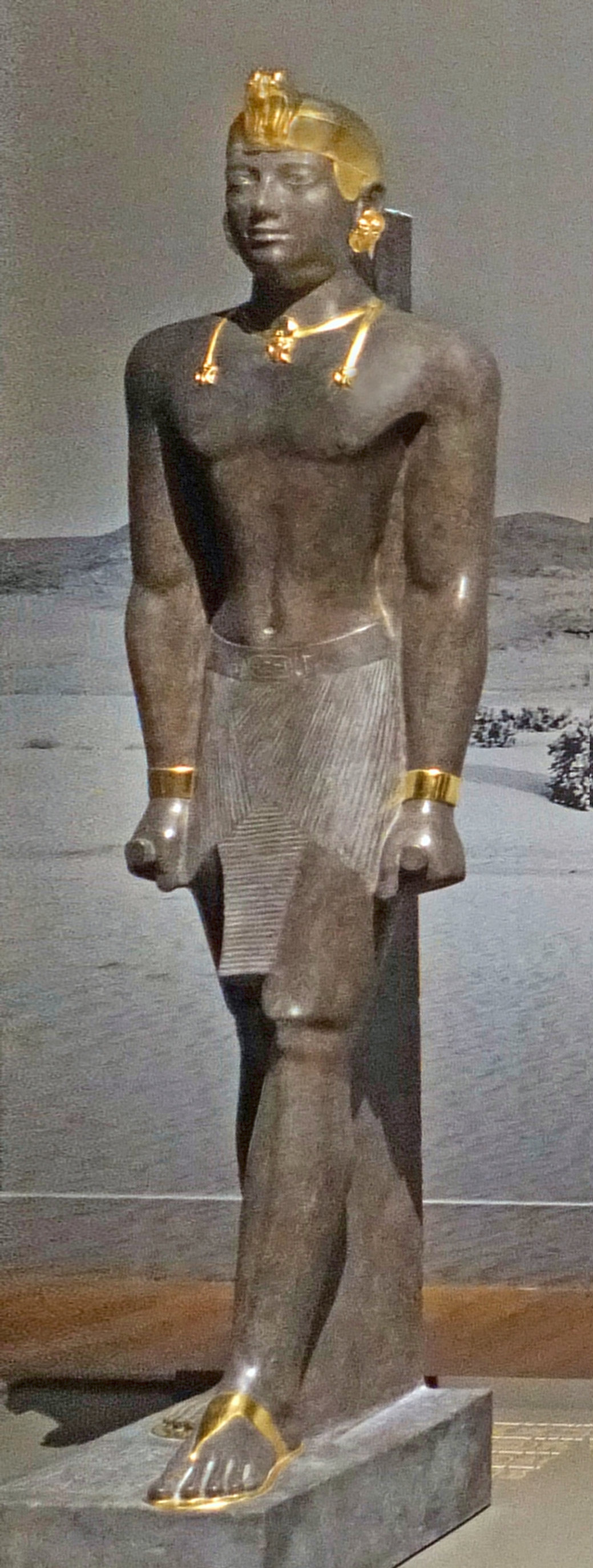
- Statue of Kushite ruler and last pharaoh of the 25th Dynasty, Tantamani (Louvre Museum, reconstruction through color-pigment analysis)

Pharaoh of Egypt Kushite King of Napata
- Reign: 664 – 656 BC (Pharaoh); 664 – 653 BC (Kushite King of Napata)
- Predecessor: Taharqa
- Successor: Psamtik I (in Egypt) and Atlanersa (in Nubia)
Royal titulary
Horus name
Wahmerut
wꜣḥ-mrwt
G5	V29 t mr
Prenomen
Bakare
bꜣ-kꜣ-Rˁ

M23 X1 L2 X1	ra E10 kA
Nomen
Tanetamun
tꜣnwꜣtj-jmn

G39 N5	i mn n N17 n V4 U33
- Consorts: Piankharty, [..]salka, possibly Malaqaye
- Children: Possibly Atlanersa, Queen Yeturow, Queen Khaliset
- Father: Shabaka (or Shebitku?)
- Mother: Queen Qalhata
- Died: 653 BC
- Dynasty: 25th dynasty

Tantamani (Ancient Egyptian: tnwt-jmn; Neo-Assyrian Akkadian: 𒁹𒌨𒁕𒈠𒉌𒂊, romanized: Tanṭammanē; Ancient Greek: Τεμένθης, romanized: Teménthēs), also known as Tanutamun or Tanwetamani (d. 653 BC) was ruler of the Kingdom of Kush located in Northern Sudan, and the last pharaoh of the Twenty-fifth Dynasty of Egypt. His prenomen or royal name was Bakare, which means "Glorious is the Ba and Ka of Re."

== Filiation ==
He was the son of King Shabaka and the nephew of his predecessor Taharqa. In some Egyptological literature he is identified as the son of Shebitku. Assyrian records call Tantamani a son of Shabaka and refer to his mother, Qalhata, as a sister of Taharqa. Some Egyptologists interpreted the Assyrian text as stating that Tantamani was a son of Shebitku, but it is now more common to consider Tantamani a son of Shabaka.

== Conflict with Ashurbanipal of Assyria ==
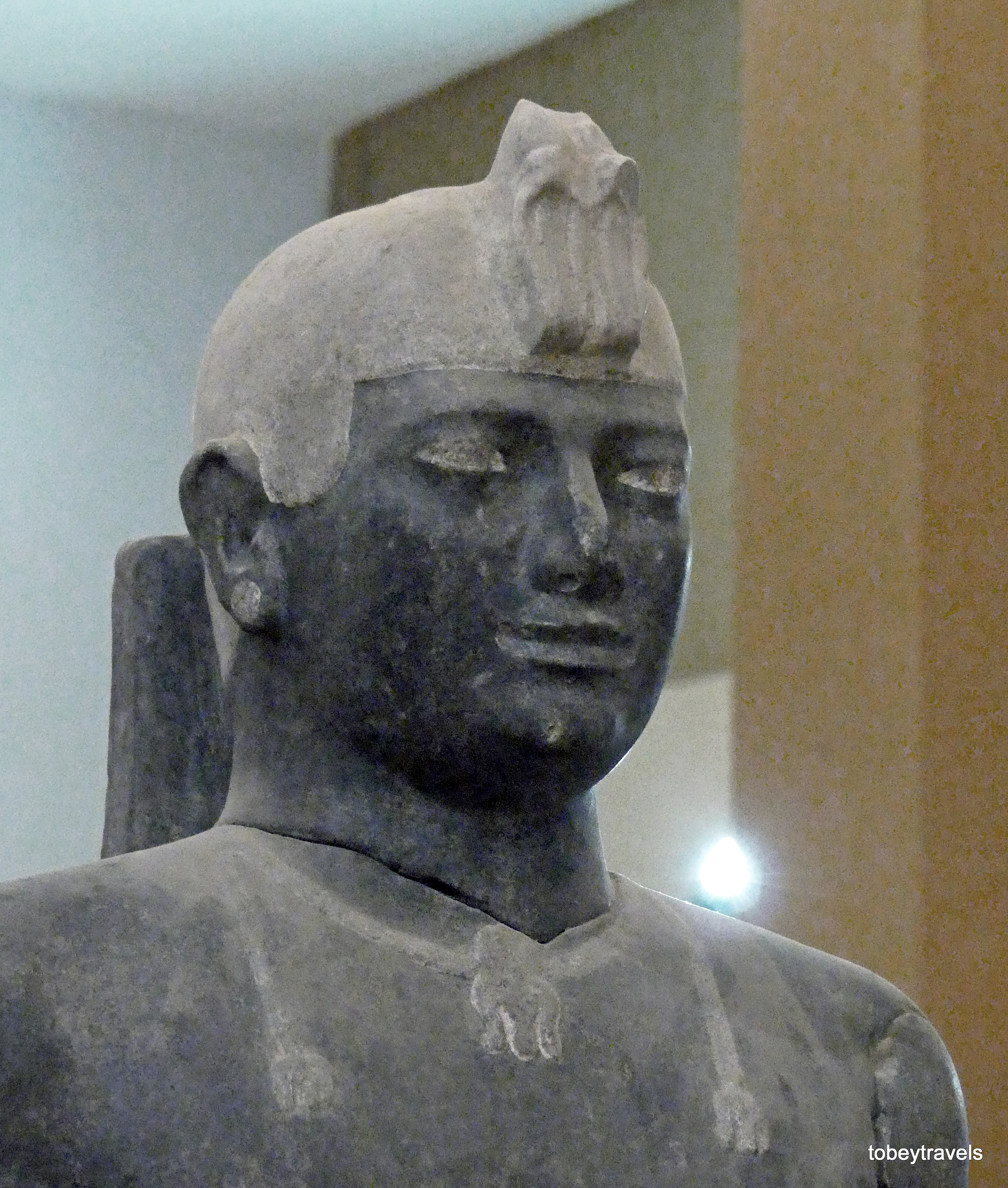
Portrait of Tantamani, Sudan National Museum.

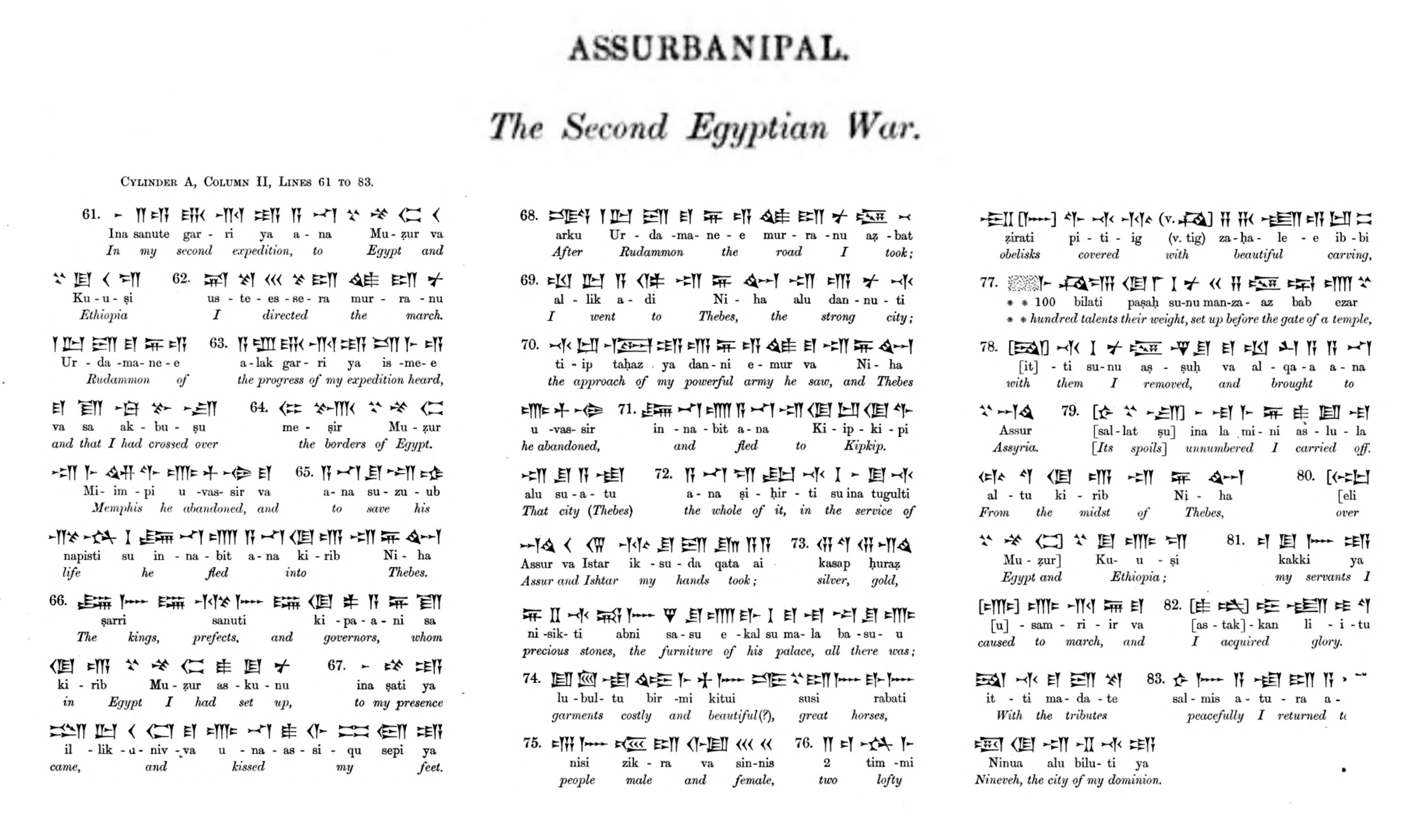
Ashurbanipal's account of his Second Campaign in Egypt against Tantamani ("Urdamanee"/ "Ruddamon"), in the Rassam cylinder

Soon after the Assyrians had appointed Necho I as king and left, Tantamani invaded Egypt in hopes of restoring his family to the throne. Tantamani marched down the Nile from Nubia and reoccupied all of Egypt, including Memphis. Necho I, and the Assyrians' representative were killed in Tantamani's campaign.

This led to a renewed conflict with Ashurbanipal in 663 BCE. The Assyrians led by Ashurbanipal returned to Egypt in force. Together with Psamtik I's army, which included Carian mercenaries, they fought a pitched battle in north Memphis, close to the temple of Isis, between the Serapeum and Abusir. Tantamani was defeated and fled to Upper Egypt. Forty days after the battle, Ashurbanipal's army arrived in Thebes. Tantamani had already left the city for Kipkipi, a location that remains uncertain but might be Kom Ombo, some 200 km (120 mi) south of Thebes. The city of Thebes was conquered, "smashed (as if by) a floodstorm" and heavily plundered in the Sack of Thebes. The event is not mentioned in Egyptian sources, but is known from the Assyrian annals, which report that the inhabitants were deported. The Assyrians took a large booty of gold, silver, precious stones, clothes, horses, fantastic animals, as well as two obelisks covered in electrum weighing 2.500 talents (c. 75.5 tons, or 166,500 lb):

Capture of Memphis by the Assyrians in 663 BCE.

This city, the whole of it, I conquered it with the help of Ashur and Ishtar. Silver, gold, precious stones, all the wealth of the palace, rich cloth, precious linen, great horses, supervising men and women, two obelisks of splendid electrum, weighing 2,500 talents, the doors of temples I tore from their bases and carried them off to Assyria. With this weighty booty I left Thebes. Against Egypt and Kush I have lifted my spear and shown my power. With full hands I have returned to Nineveh, in good health.

— Rassam cylinder of Ashurbanipal

The sack of Thebes was a momentous event that reverberated throughout the Ancient Near East. It is mentioned in the Book of Nahum chapter 3:8-10:

Art thou better than populous No, that was situate among the rivers, that had the waters round about it, whose rampart was the sea, and her wall was from the sea? Ethiopia and Egypt were her strength, and it was infinite; Put and Lubim were thy helpers. Yet was she carried away, she went into captivity: her young children also were dashed in pieces at the top of all the streets: and they cast lots for her honourable men, and all her great men were bound in chains

A prophecy in the Book of Isaiah refers to the sack as well:

Just as my servant Isaiah has gone stripped and barefoot for three years, as a sign and portent against Egypt and Cush, so the king of Assyria will lead away stripped and barefoot the Egyptian captives and Cushite exiles, young and old, with buttocks bared—to Egypt's shame. Those who trusted in Cush and boasted in Egypt will be dismayed and put to shame.

The Assyrian reconquest effectively ended Nubian control over Egypt, although Tantamani's authority was still recognised in Upper Egypt until his 8th Year in 656 BCE, when Psamtik I's navy peacefully took control of Thebes and effectively unified all of Egypt. These events marked the start of the Twenty-sixth Dynasty of Egypt.

== Later rule ==
Thereafter, Tantamani ruled only Nubia (Kush). He died in 653 BC and was succeeded by Atlanersa, a son of Taharqa. He was buried in the family cemetery at El-Kurru. The archaeologist Charles Bonnet discovered the statue of Tantamani at Kerma (now called Doukki Gel) in 2003.

== Tomb in El-Kurru ==
The tomb of Tantamani was located below a pyramid, now disappeared, at the site of El-Kurru. Only the entrance and the chambers remain, which are beautifully decorated with mural paintings.

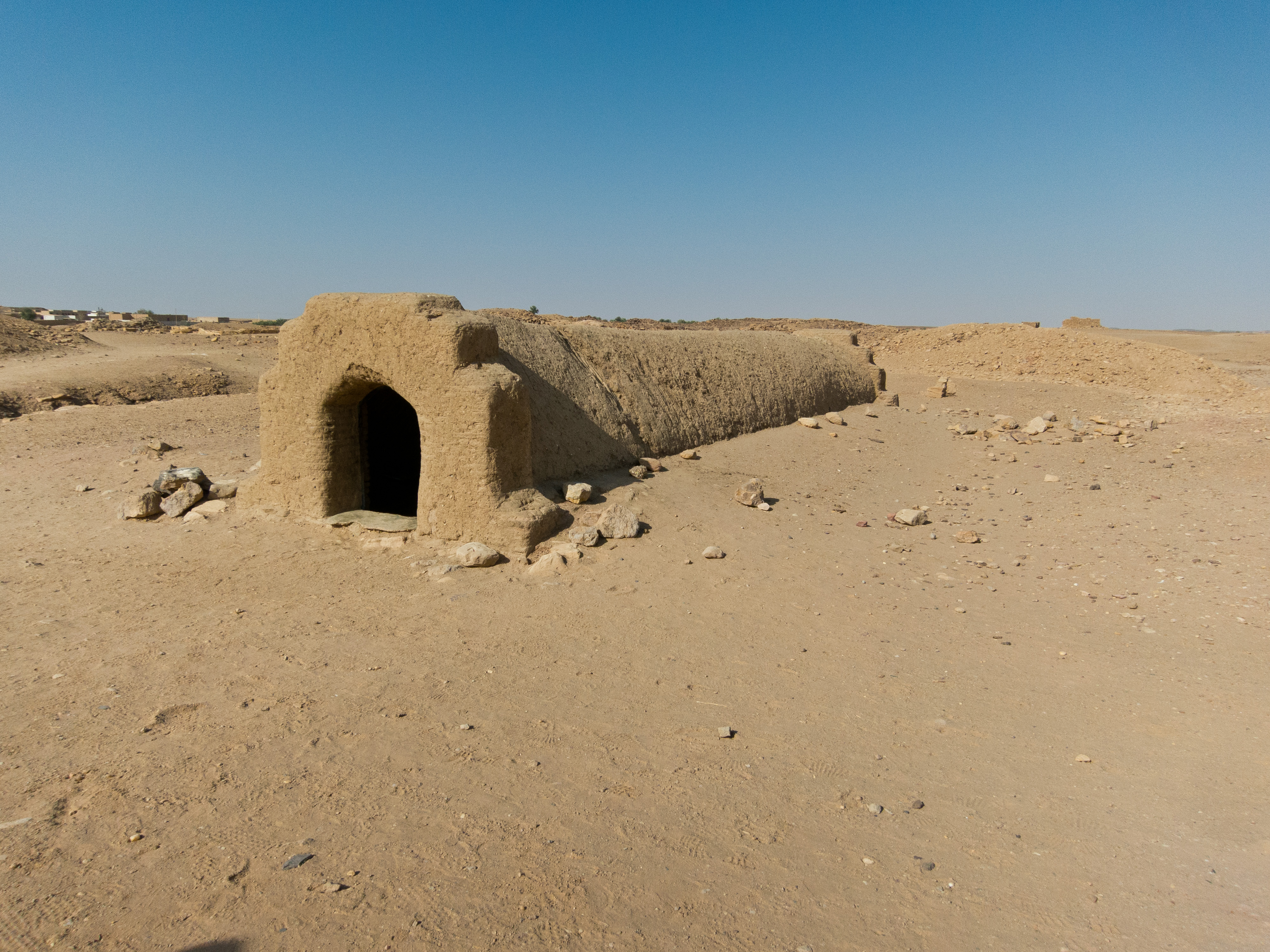
Exterior of the Nubian tomb of Tantamani.

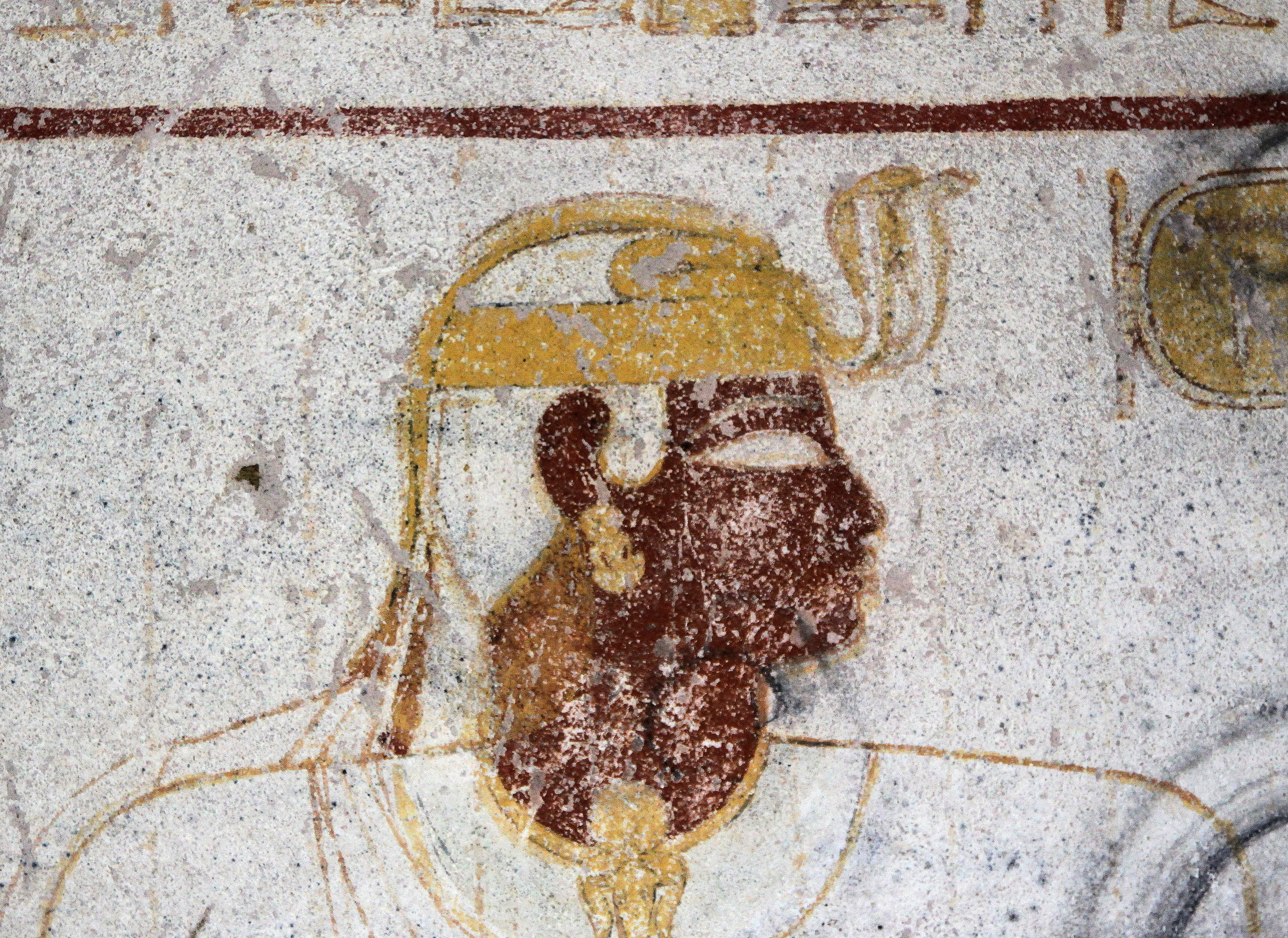
Portrait of Tantamani in his tomb in El-Kurru

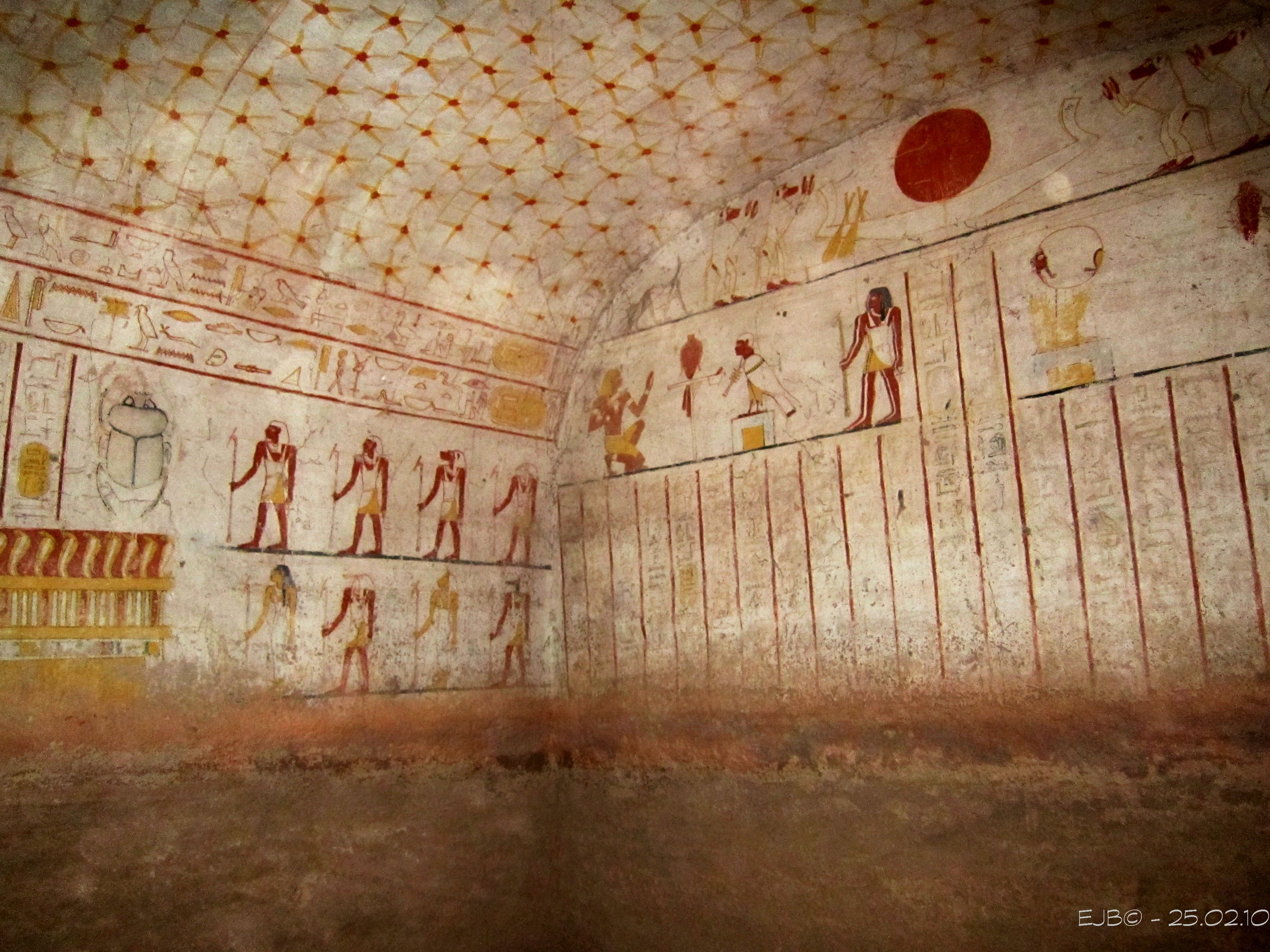
Tomb of the pyramid of Tantamani, at the site of El-Kurru

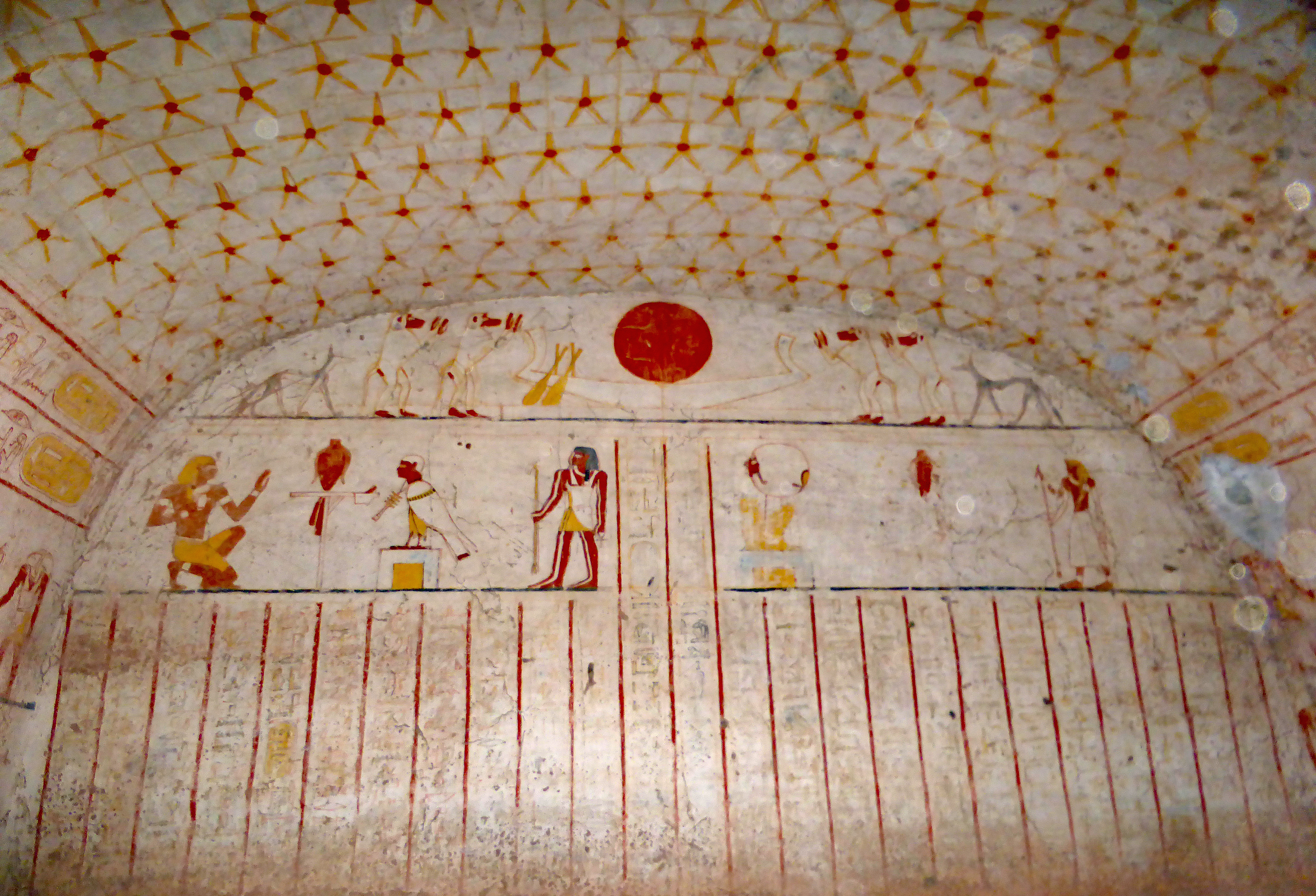
Burial Chamber of Tantamani

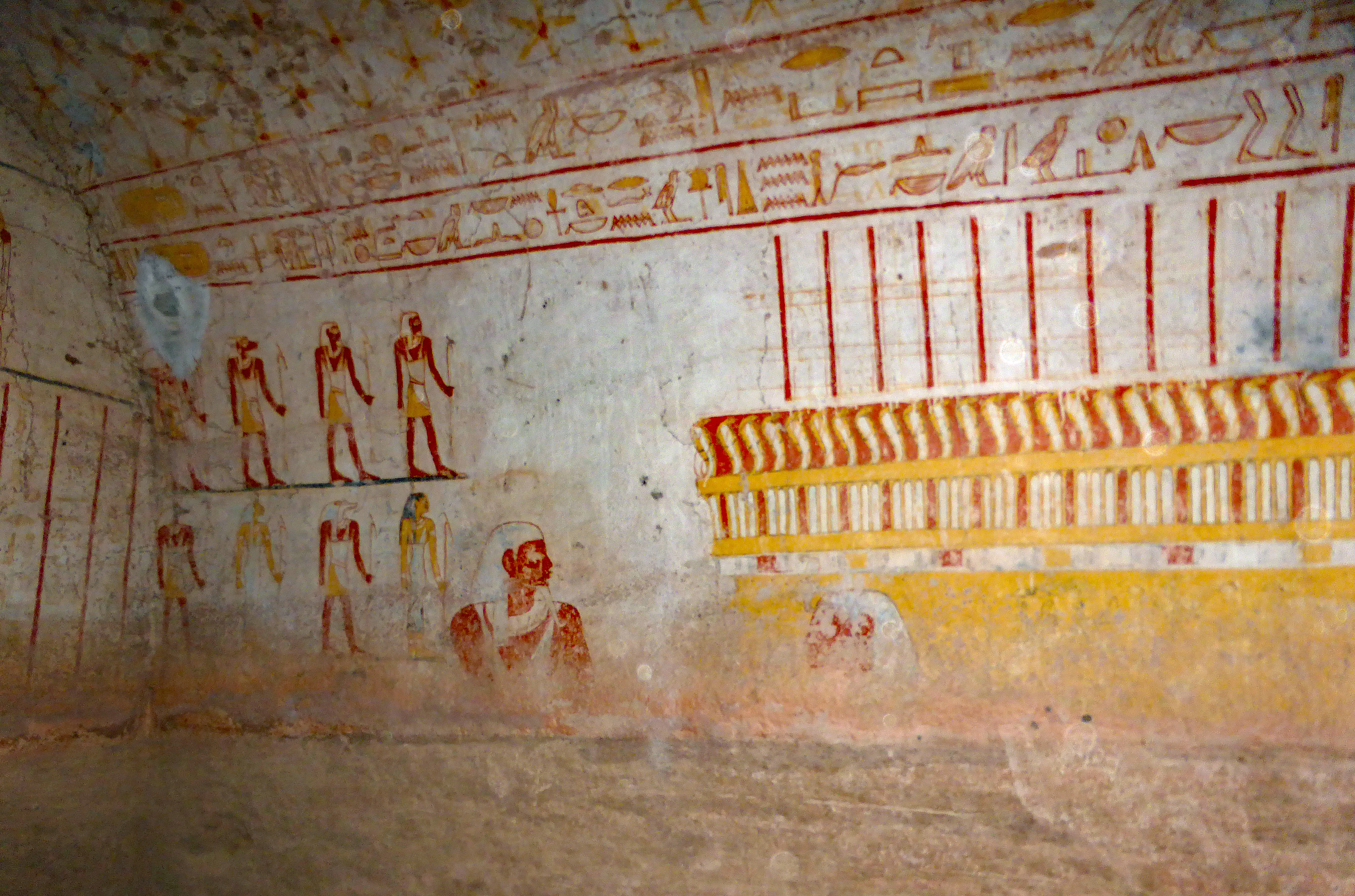
Tomb of Tantamani

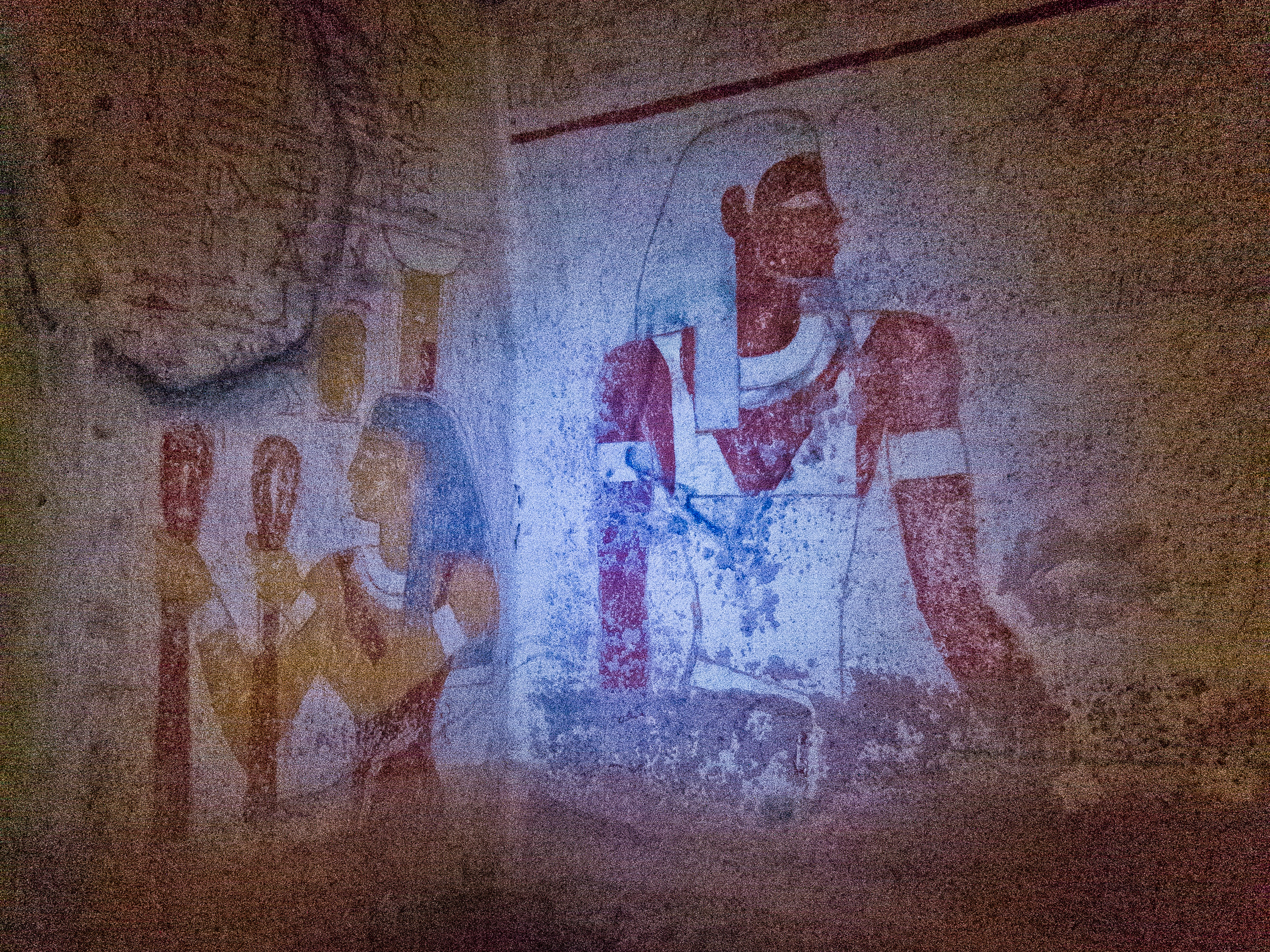
Burial Chamber of Tantamani

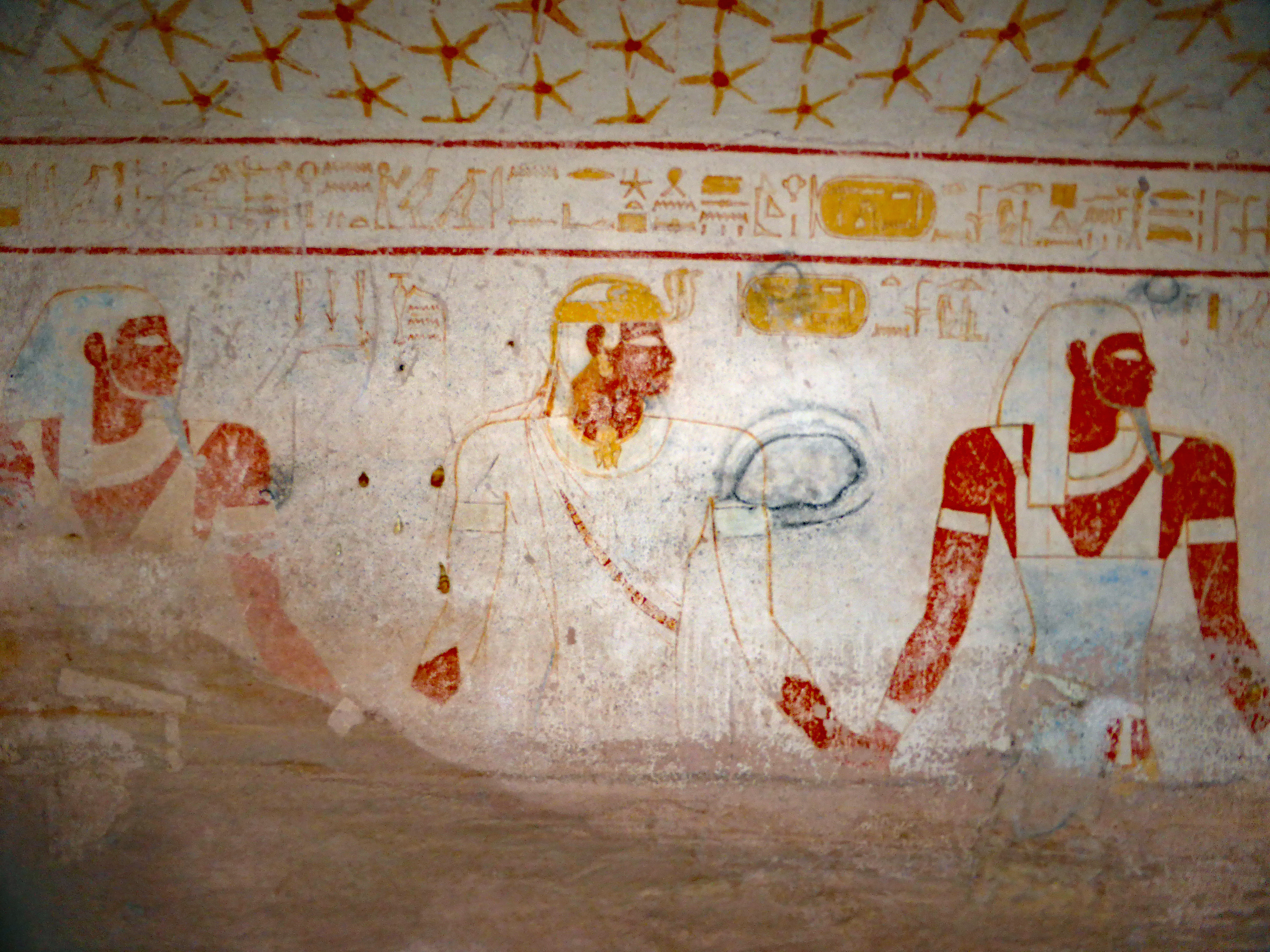
Tomb of Tantamani

== Artifacts ==
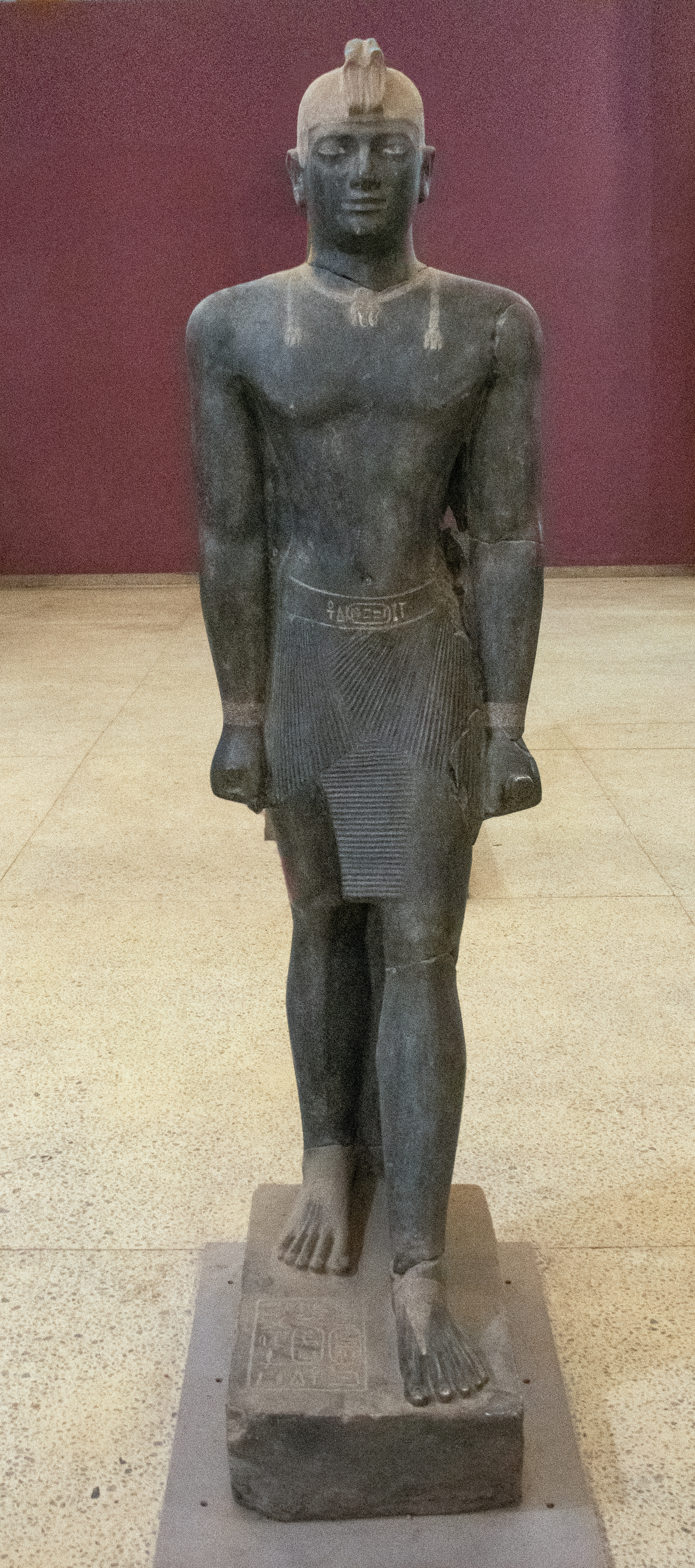
King Tantamani, National Museum of Sudan

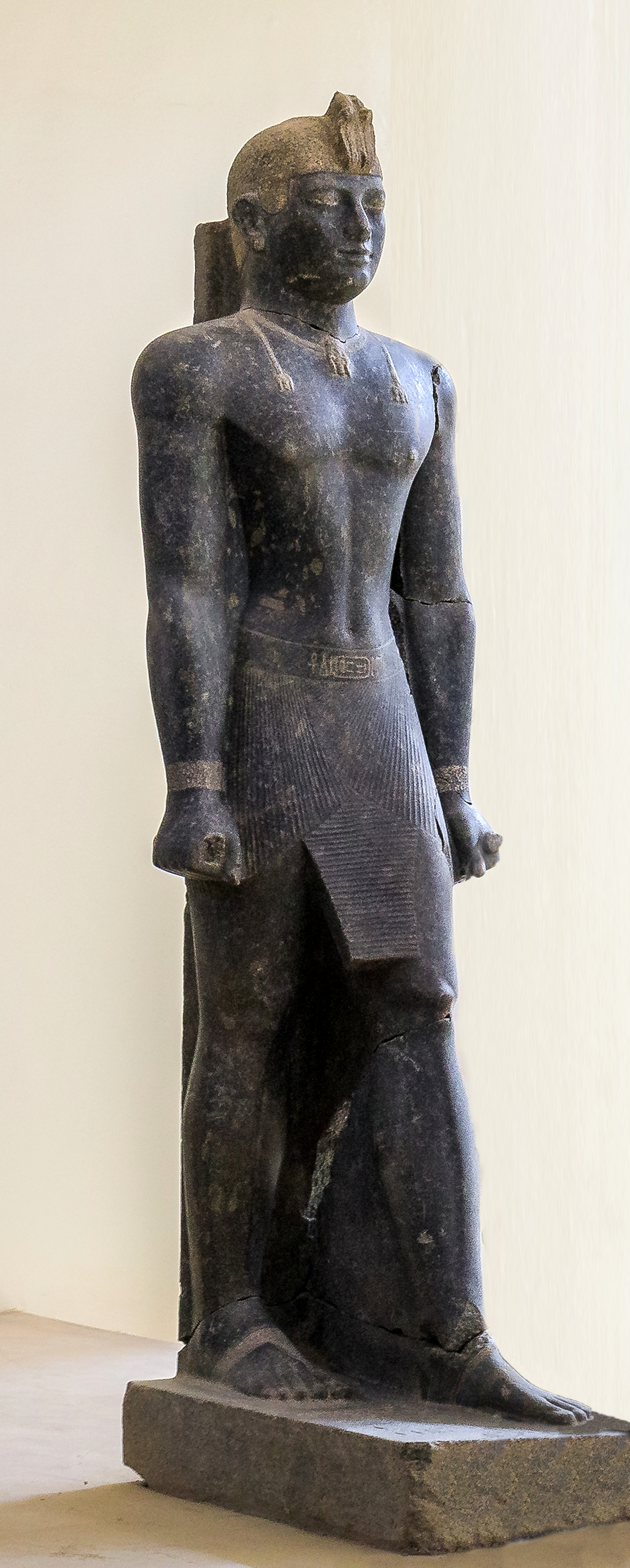
Statue of Tantamani, Kerma Museum

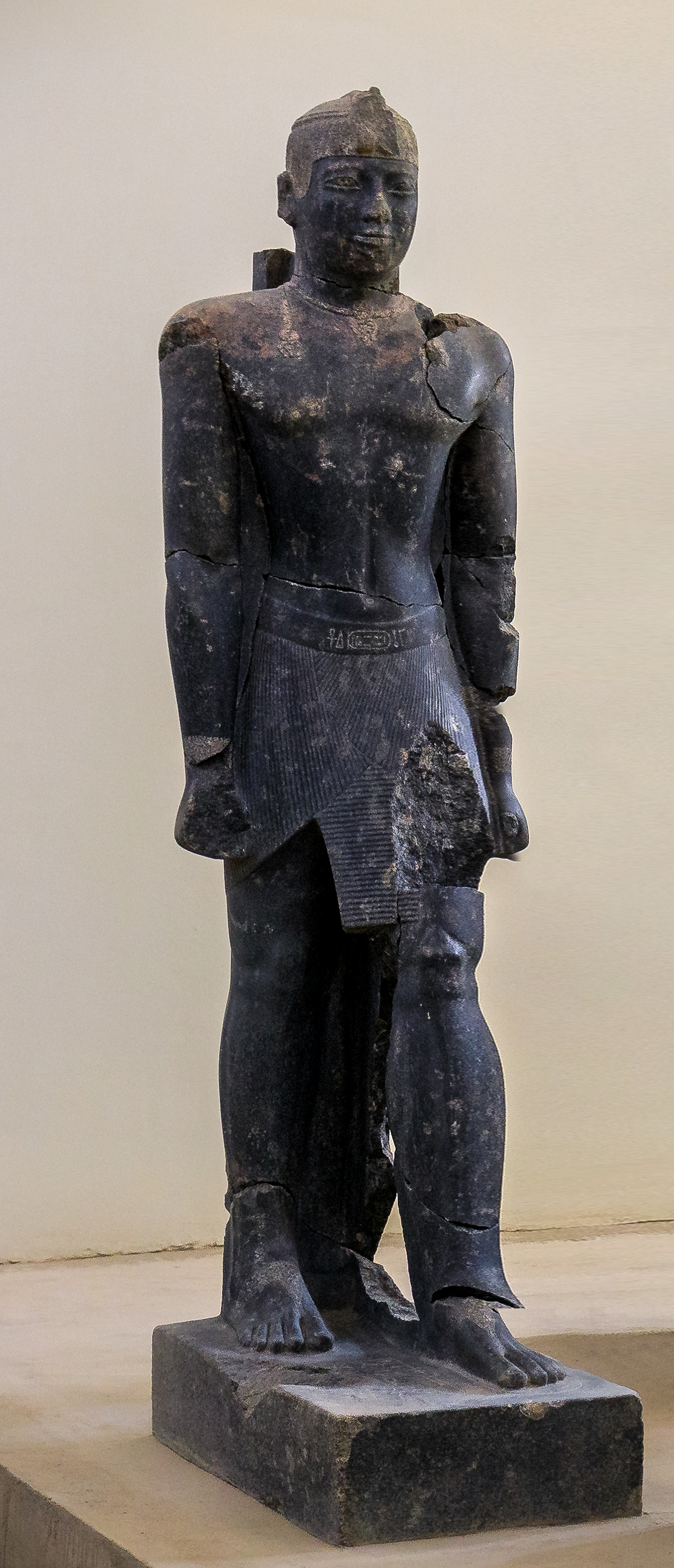
Yet another statue of Tantamani, Kerma Museum

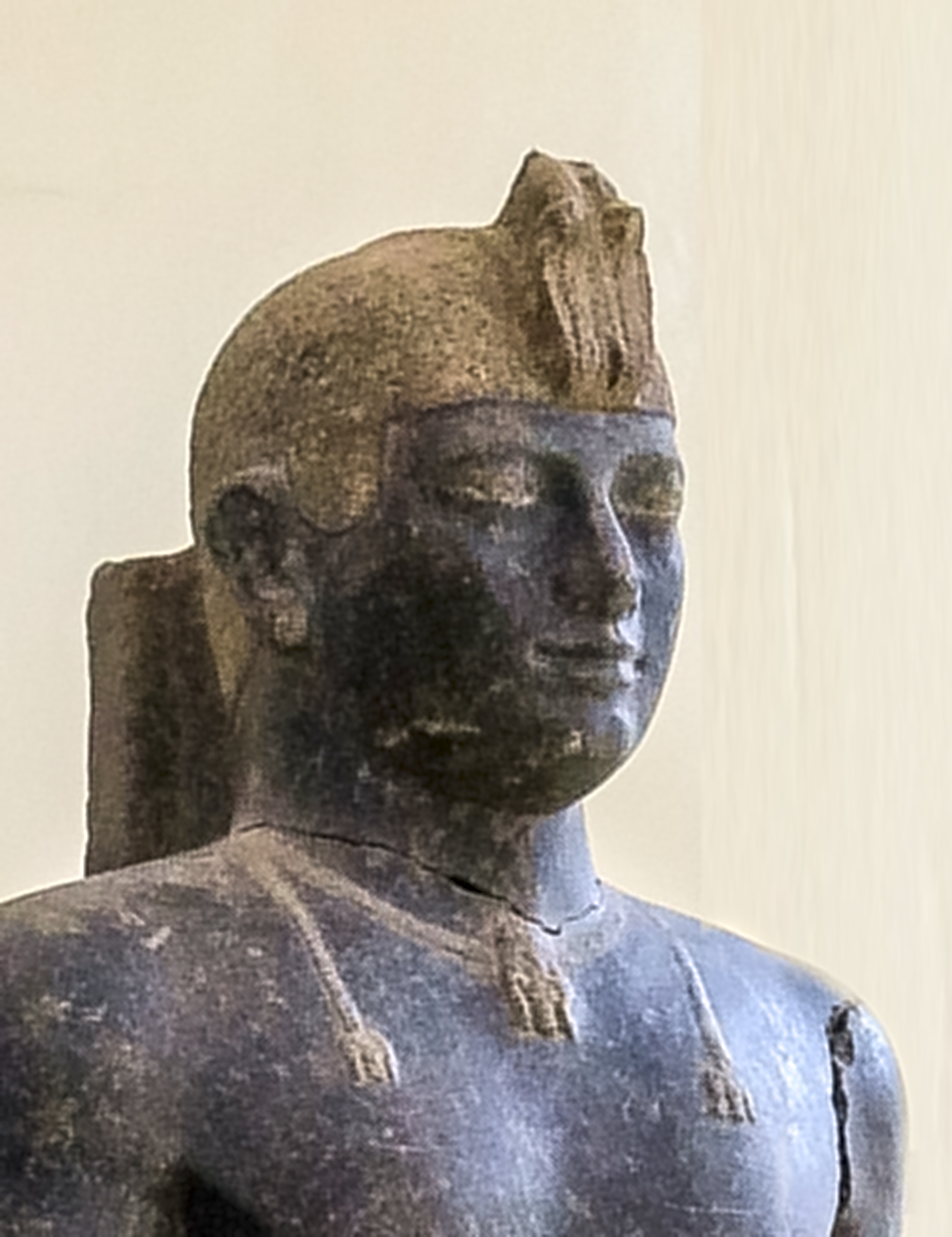
Tanotamun portrait in Kerma Museum

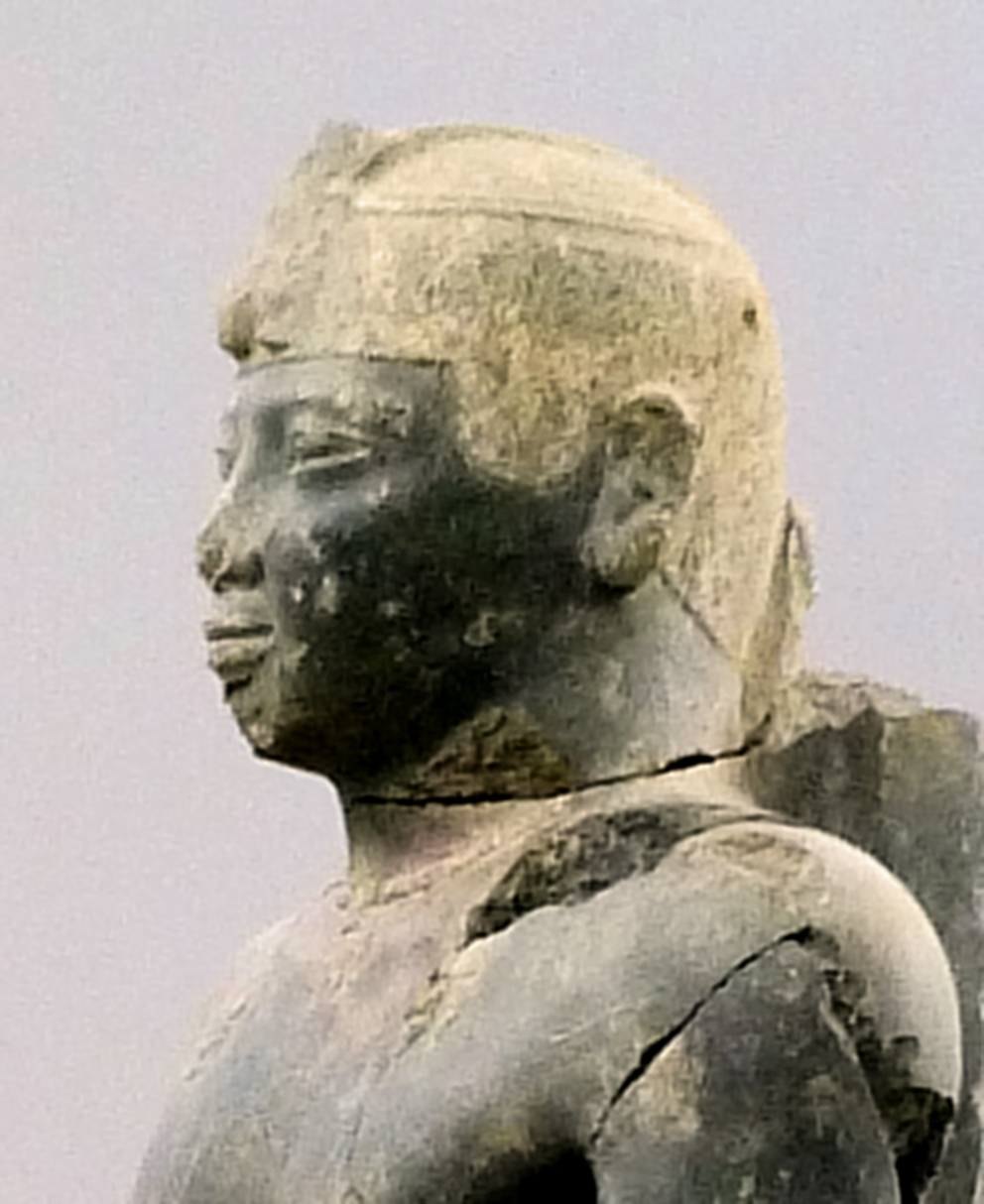
Tantamani, in profile. Kerma Museum

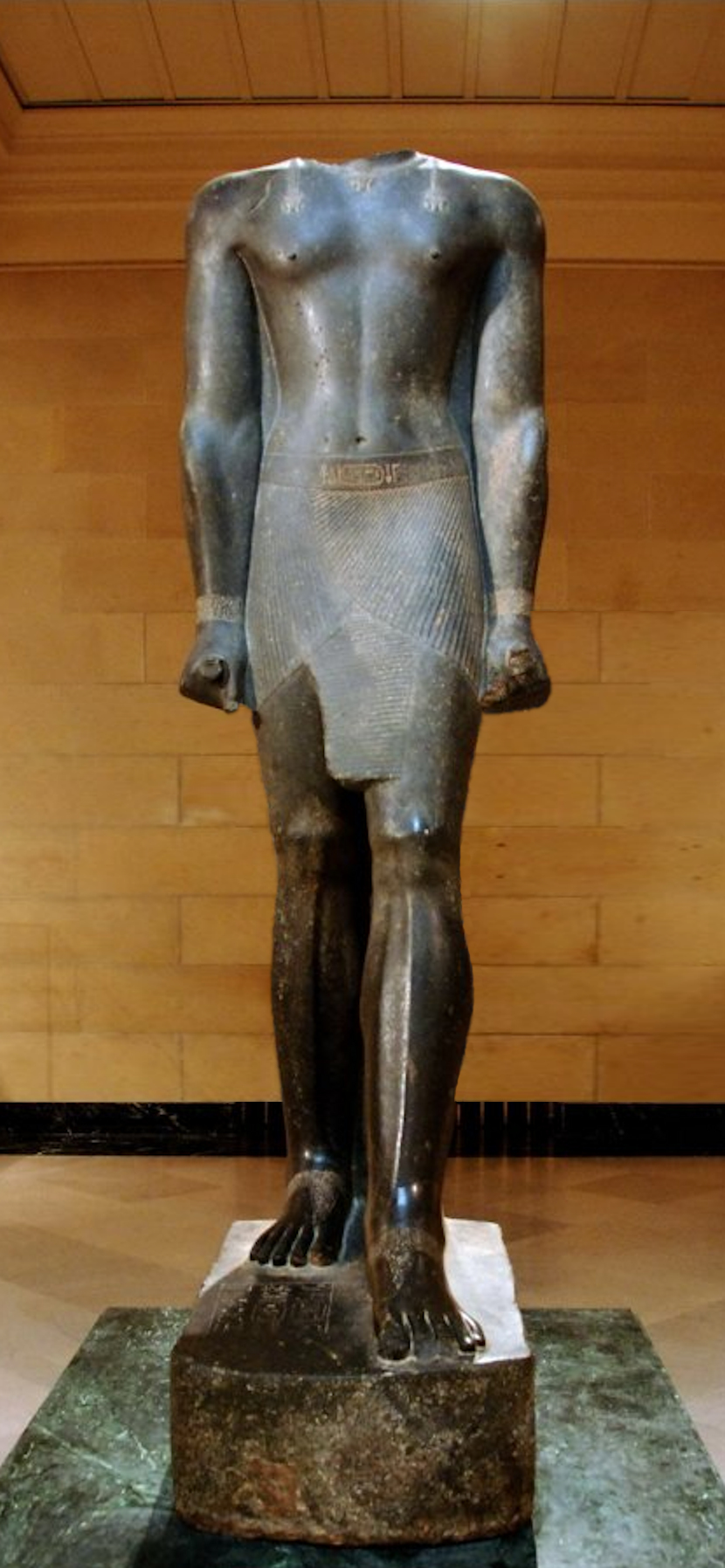
Tantamani statue, Toledo Museum of Art

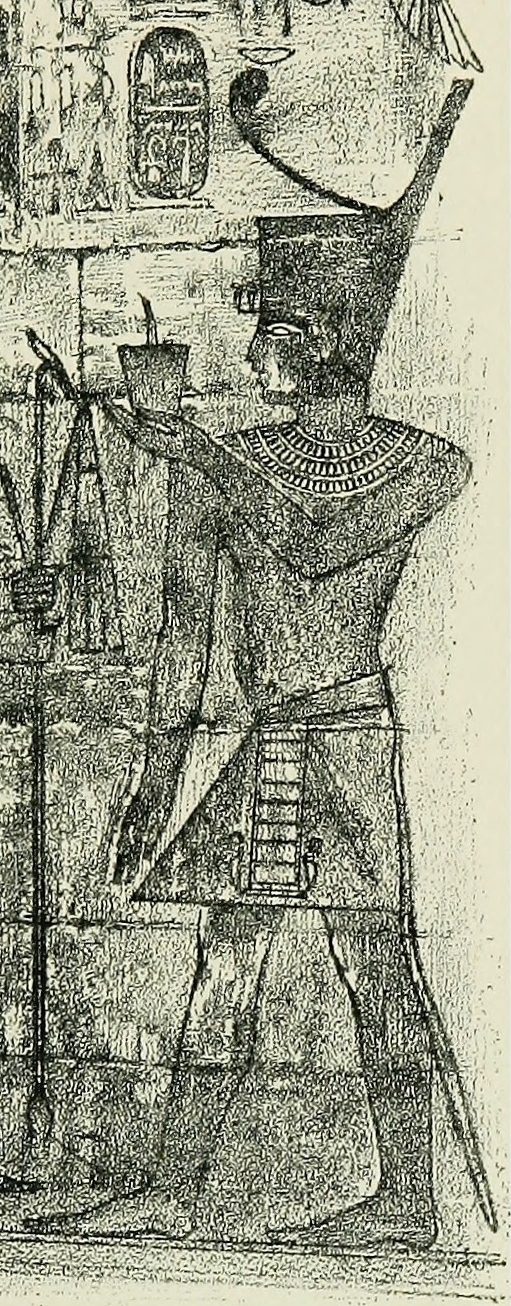
Painting of Tantamani, in Thebes

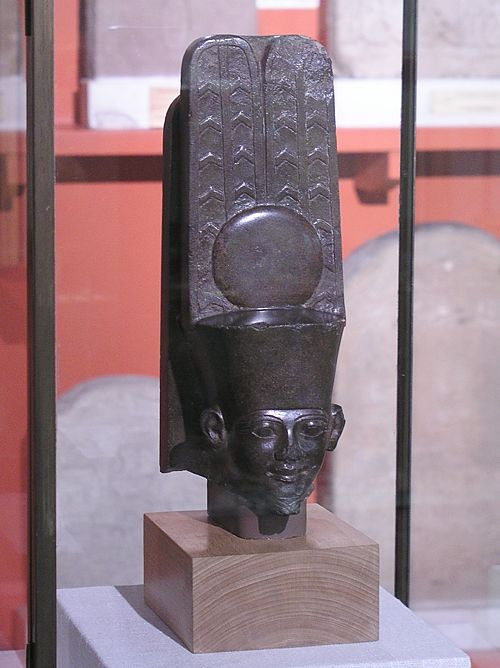
Statuette of god Amon dedicated by Tantamani

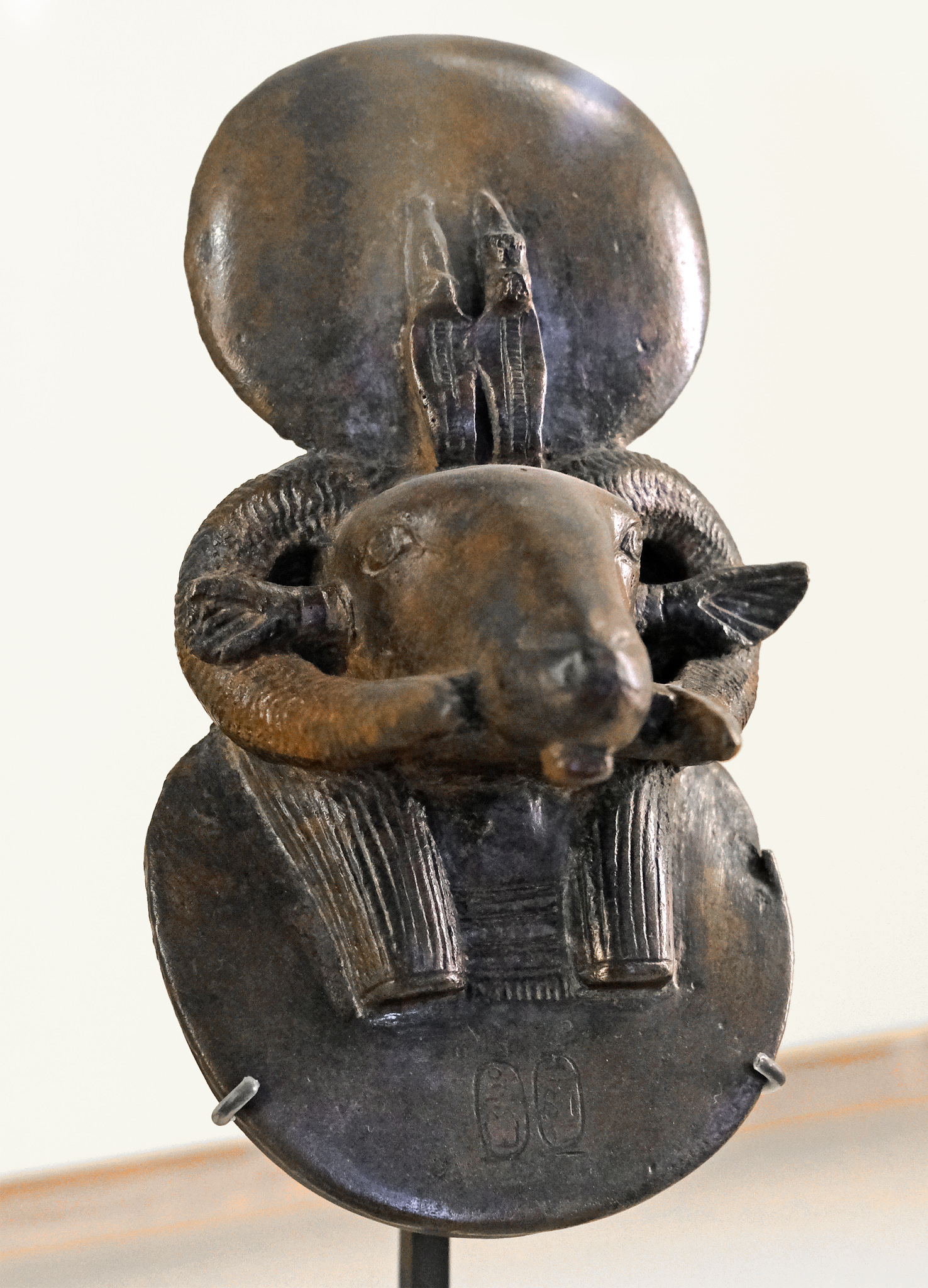
Head of Amon-Ram dedicated by Tantamani, Musée du Louvre

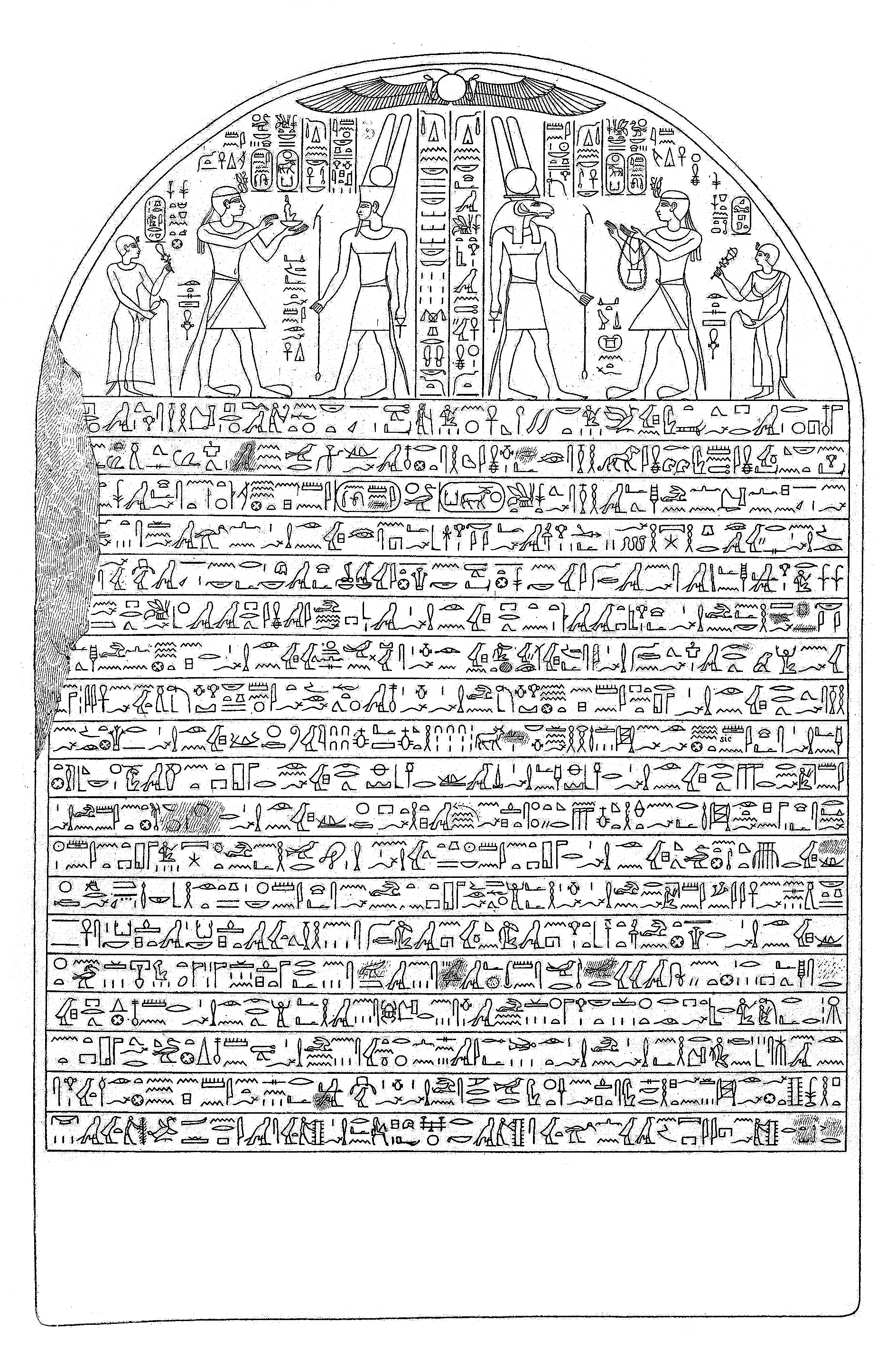
Stele of the Dream by Tantamani, Jebel Barkal, Sudan

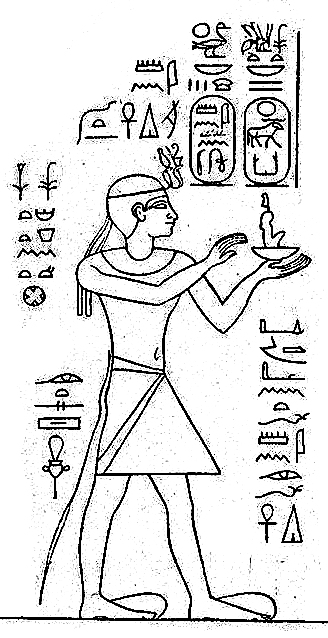
Stele of the Dream, Tantamani making offerings to Egyptian Gods

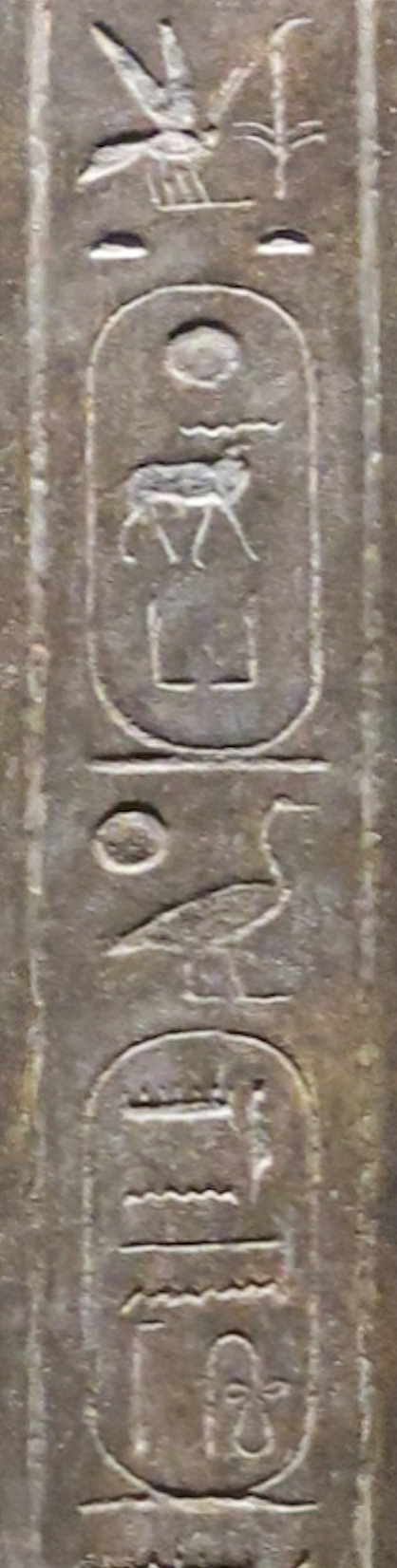
Prenomen and Nomen of Tantamani

== See also ==
- List of monarchs of Kush

Regnal titles
Preceded by Taharqa	Pharaoh of Egypt; 664 – 656 BC	Succeeded by Psamtik I
Preceded by Taharqa	King of Kush; 664 – 653 BC	Succeeded by Atlanersa
