= Robert Morkot =

British archaeologist (1957–2025)

Robert George Morkot
- Born: October 1957
- Died: 21 October 2025 (aged 67–68); Devon, England
- Occupations: Archaeologist; Egyptologist; Lecturer

Academic background
- Education: University College London
- Thesis: Economic and cultural exchange between Kush and Egypt (1993)
- Doctoral advisor: Archaeology

Academic work
- Sub-discipline: Egyptology
- Institutions: Petrie Museum of Egyptian Archaeology; University of Exeter

Robert George Morkot, FSA (October 1957 – 21 October 2025) was a British archaeologist and academic, specialising in Ancient Egypt. He was a Senior Lecturer in Archaeology at the University of Exeter. His research focused on the external relations of Ancient Egypt, particularly the relations with Kush (Sudan). He also worked on the historiography of Ancient Egypt.

== Biography ==
Morkot worked at the Petrie Museum of Egyptian Archaeology before completing a PhD at University College London (1983–1987) on the relations of Egypt with Kush between 1500 and 700 BC. He was a Fellow at the Oriental Institute, Oxford from 1987 to 1991 and taught at The City University and the University of Surrey before he joined the University of Exeter in 1996.

Morkot contributed to the 1991 book Centuries of Darkness, edited by Peter James. The book, questioning the conventional Egyptian chronology, caused a stir in the academic community and beyond; its thesis remains controversial.

In addition to his academic work, Morkot wrote a number of books on Egypt aimed at the general public, along with a book on Greek history, the Penguin Historical Atlas of Ancient Greece.

== Honours ==
On 12 March 2015, Morkot was elected Fellow of the Society of Antiquaries of London (FSA).

== Death ==
Morkot died of terminal cancer on 21 October 2025.

== Books ==
- The Egyptians: An Introduction. Routledge, 2005. ISBN 0-415-27103-7
- Historical Dictionary of Ancient Egyptian Warfare, The Scarecrow Press, 2003. ISBN 0-8108-4862-7
- Ancient Egypt and the Middle East, Dorling Kindersley Publishing, 2001. ISBN 0-7894-7833-1
- The Empires of Ancient Egypt, BBC Books, 2001. ISBN 978-0-563-53758-8
- The Black Pharaohs: Egypt's Nubian Rulers, The Rubicon Press, 2000. ISBN 0-948695-23-4
- The Penguin Historical Atlas of Ancient Greece, Penguin Press, 1996
- Centuries of Darkness: A Challenge to the Conventional Chronology of Old World Archaeology, with P.J. James (ed), I.J. Thorpe, N. Kokkinos and J.A. Frankish. London: Jonathan Cape, 1991, ISBN 0-224-02647-X
- Collins Illustrated Guide to Egypt, HarperCollins, 1989. ISBN 978-0-00-215227-3
