= El-Kurru =

Royal cemetery used by Kushite royals

- الكرو (Arabic)
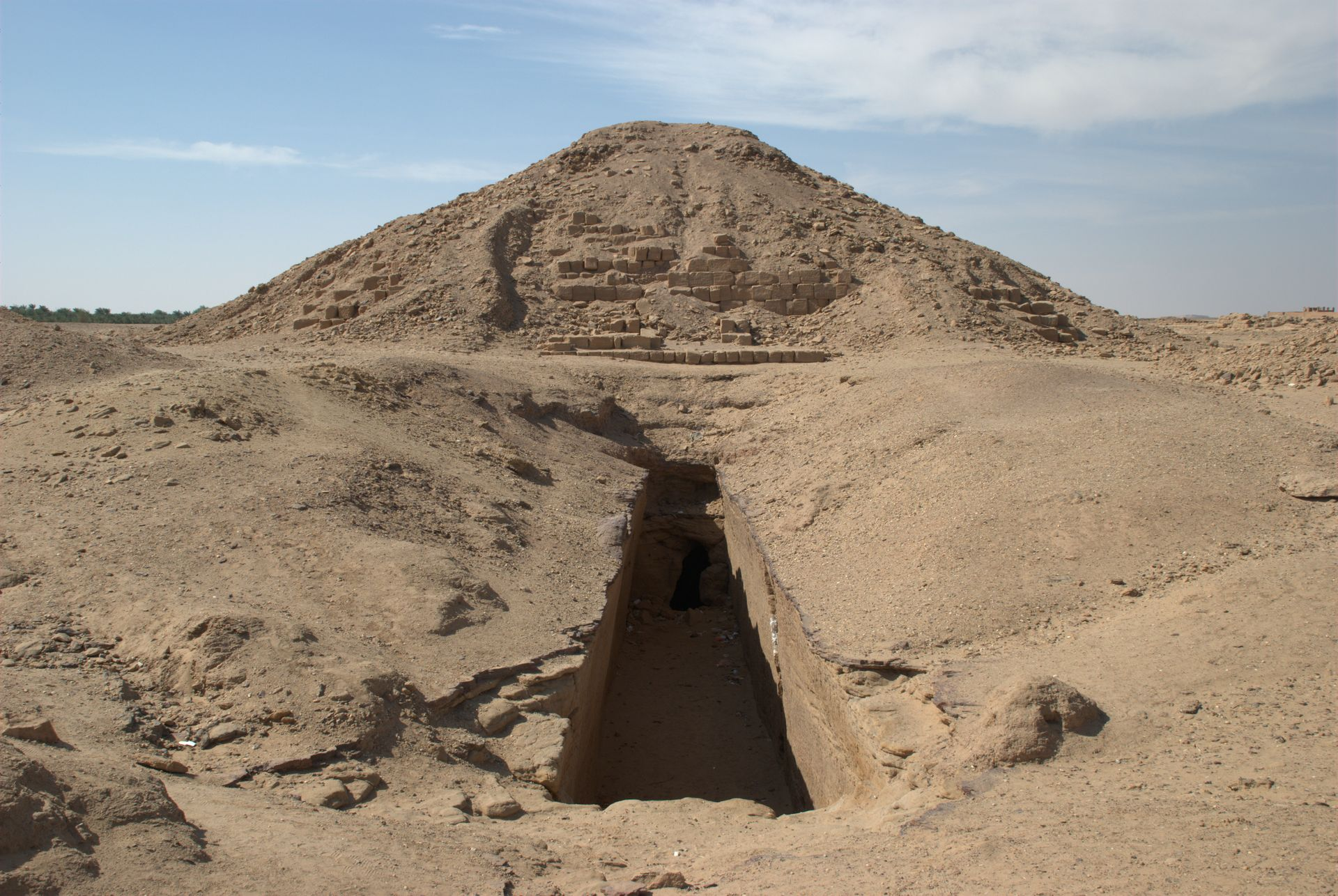
- Pyramid K.1 at El-Kurru

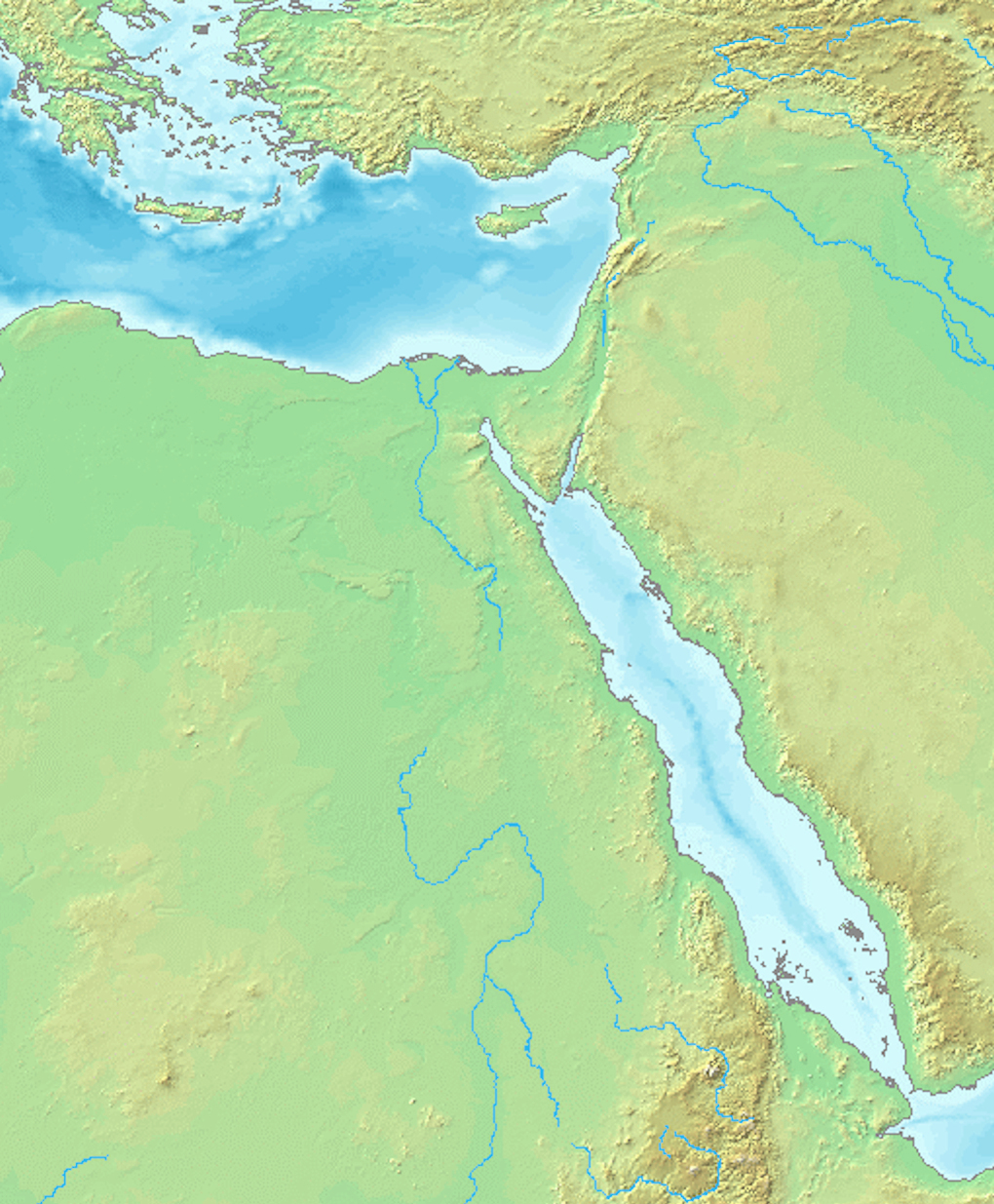
- Location within Northeast Africa Location within Sudan
- 18°24′36″N 31°46′17″E
- Type: Settlement
- Location: Northern State, Sudan
- Region: Nubia

Site notes
- Condition: restored

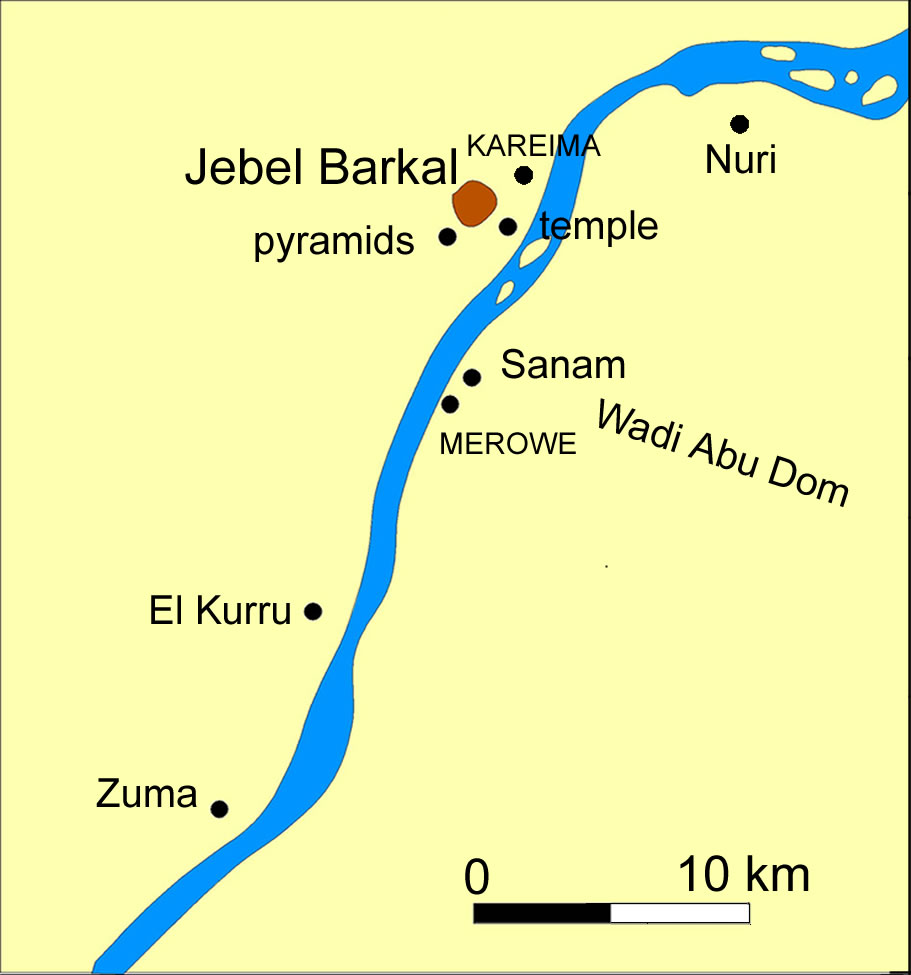
Relative location of El-Kurru.

El-Kurru was the first of the three royal cemeteries used by the Kushite royals of Napata, also referred to as Egypt's 25th Dynasty, and is home to some of the royal Nubian Pyramids. It is located between the 3rd and 4th cataracts of the Nile about 1 mile (1.6 km) west of the river in what is now Northern state, Sudan. El-Kurru was first excavated by George Reisner in 1918 and 1919 and after his death his assistant Dows Dunham took over his work and published the excavation report on El-Kurru in 1950. The El-Kurru cemetery was primarily used from about 860 BC until 650 BC. The first tomb with a name attached to it is that of King Piye (also known as King Piankhy) dating to about 750 BC, the sixteen earlier tombs possibly belong to Piye's royal predecessors. The last 25th dynasty king, Tantamani, was buried at El-Kurru around 650 BC. The subsequent Napatan rulers chose to be buried at the royal cemetery at Nuri instead. However, in the mid-4th century the 20th king, whose name is unknown, chose to have his tomb, as well as that of his queen, built at El-Kurru.

== History and description ==
Reisner thought that the earliest tomb, Tum.1, dated back to the time of Pharaoh Sheshonq I of Ancient Egypt (c. 860 BC) and predates the Kingdom of Napata by some 200 years. At the present, some scholars (Hakem, Torok) think the early cemetery stretches back to the Ramesside period and date the earliest burials to the end of the Twentieth Dynasty of Egypt (c. 1070 BC). However, other scholars, including Kendall, more or less agree with Reisner's chronology, and move the date of initial use to 850-830 BC as opposed to Reisner's proposed date of 860 BC.

The cemetery is divided into three parts by two wadis. The central section seems to be the oldest and contains several tumulus type tombs that predate the Kingdom of Napata. The highest part of the cemetery contains four tumulus tombs (Tum. 1, 2, 4 and 5). Tum. 6 is located to the north, across the northern wadi. To the east of the tumuli is a row of at least eight pyramids. One of them partially intrudes on a tumulus tomb (Tum. 19). According to Dunham and Reisner, the southernmost of this row of pyramids (Ku.8) belongs to King Kashta and (presumably to) his wife Pebatjma, and tomb Ku.9 belongs to King Alara, however there are no written records of names associated with these tombs. Before this row is another row of pyramids which includes those of Piye, Shabaka and Tantamani.

The southern pyramids are located to the south of the pyramid of Pebatjma, across the southern wadi. These are the pyramids of the Queens: Naparaye (Ku.3), Khensa (Ku.4), Qalhata (Ku.5), and Ku.6 which possibly belongs to Arty.

As mentioned previously, not all of the tombs at El-Kurru are pyramids. Tombs Tum. 1, 2, 3, 4, 5, 6 (tum. standing for tumulus), and Ku.19 are all Nubian style tumuli that consist of a rock-cut pit covered by a circular mound of gravel, pebbles, and rubble. This style of tumulus is also seen in C-Group burials and at burials at Kerma. However, the style of the tumuli changed with time. Tum.6 and Ku.19 both have circular enclosure walls, which are sturdier than the rubble piles that topped the previous tombs, and had offering chapels. The following ten tombs built, Ku. 14, 13, 11, 10, 9, 23, 21, 8, 20, 7, also had offering chapels (except for Ku.21 and Ku.20) and had square plan rather than circular. Reisner believed that these square tombs were mastabas, flat topped structures, but scholars Lohwasser and Kendall argue that they were actually topped with small pyramids that were removed when the tombs were looted. King Piye's tomb (Ku.17) marks another change in the building style of the tombs at El-Kurru, he was buried in a vaulted chamber that was both rock cut and built with stone masonry. The royal pyramids built after King Piye's were similarly monumental and King Tanwetamani (Ku.16) and Queen Qalhata's (Ku.5) tombs are even exquisitely painted with scenes of the Egyptian underworld. Unfortunately, both the interior and exterior of almost all of the tombs at El-Kurru were looted, leaving the tombs in disrepair. However, the artifacts that were left behind indicate that these rulers were incredibly wealthy and successful.

In the medieval period, when the region was part of the Christian kingdom of Makuria, El-Kurru constituted a walled settlement functioning until about 1200. In this period, Christian Nubians carved various graffiti into pyramid Ku. 1, including monograms, Christian symbols and, most remarkably, a multitude of boats, perhaps commemorating "some kind of river procession."

== Pyramids and tombs at El-Kurru ==
- Tum. 1, dates to 860-840 BC, no names found associated with the tomb.
- Tum. 2, dates to 800-780 BC, the tomb contained a female skull, no names found associated with the tomb.
- Tum. 4, dates to 860-840 BC, no names found associated with the tomb.
- Tum. 5, dates to 860-840 BC, no names found associated with the tomb.
- Tum. 6, dates to 840-820 BC, tomb located to the north of Tum.1, across the northern wadi. No name found associated with the tomb.
- Ku. 19, dates to 840-820 BC, located to the east of the cluster of tumulus tombs. Pyramid Ku.13 partly obliterated a section of this tomb.
- Ku.13 – dates to 820-800 BC, no name was found associated with the tomb.
- Ku.14 – dates to 820-800 BC, no name was found associated with the tomb.
- Ku.9 – dates to 800-780 BC, possibly belongs to King Alara of Nubia, but no name was found associated with the tomb.
- Ku.10 – dates to 800-780 BC, no name was found associated with the tomb.
- Ku.11 – dates to 800-780 BC, no name was found associated with the tomb. The pyramid contained a female skull.
- Ku.21 and Ku.23 – date to 780-760 BC, no names were found associated with these tombs.

Tombs dating to the time of the Kingdom of Napata (ca 750 – 650 BC) and later

- Ku.8 – dates to 760-751 BC, possibly belongs to King Kashta, father of Piye.
- Ku.20 – dates to 751-716 BC, no name was found associated with this tomb.
- Ku.7 – dates to 751-715 BC, possibly belongs to Queen Pebatjma, sister-wife of Kashta. Located next to the pyramid Ku.8, the possible pyramid of Kashta.
- Ku.22 – dates to 751-716 BC, no name was found associated with this tomb.
- Ku.17 – dates to 751-716 BC, belongs to King Piye, son of Kashta.
- Ku.53 – dates to 751-716 BC, belongs to Queen Tabiry, daughter of Alara, wife of Piye.
- Ku.54 – dates to 751-716 BC, possibly belongs to Peksater, daughter of Kashta, wife of Piye.
- Ku.55 – dates to 751-716 BC, likely belongs to a queen.
- Ku.221-224 – 751-716 BC, tombs contains the horses of King Piye.
- Ku.15 – dates to 716-701 BC, belongs to King Shabaka, son of Kashta, brother of Piye.
- Ku.51 – dates to 716-701 BC, likely belongs to a queen.
- Ku.52 – dates to 716-701 BC, belongs to Queen Nefrukekashta, wife of Piye.
- Ku.62 – dates to 716-701 BC, belongs to a queen of unknown name.
- Ku.71 – dates to 716-701 BC, likely belongs to a queen.
- Ku.201-208 – dates to 716-701 BC, contains the horses of King Shabaka.
- Ku.18 – dates to 701-690 BC, belongs to King Shebitku, son of Piye. Located west of the pyramid of Kashta and south of the tumulus tombs. The pyramid still contained a human skull which may have belonged to Shebitku himself.
- Ku.72 – dates to 701-690 BC, likely belongs to a queen.
- Ku.209-216 – dates to 701-690 BC, contains the horses of King Shebitku.
- Ku.3 – dates to 690-664 BC, belongs to Queen Naparaye, daughter of Piye, sister-wife of Taharqa.
- Ku.4 – dates to 690-664 BC, belongs to Queen Khensa, daughter of Kashta, sister-wife of Piye.
- Ku.16 – dates to 664-653 BC, belongs to King Tantamani, son of Shebitku and Queen Qalhata. It has two well-preserved underground chambers with both wall and roof paintings.
- Ku.5 – dates to 664-653 BC, belongs to Queen Qalhata, wife of Shebitku, mother of Tantamani.
- Ku.6 – dates to 664-653 BC, possibly belongs to Queen Arty, daughter of Piye and sister-wife of Shebitku.
- Ku.217-220 – dates to 664-653 BC, contains the horses of King Tantamani.
- Ku.61 – dates to 653-643 BC, possibly belongs to one of Tantamani's queens.
- Ku.1 – dates to 362-342 BC, it was built by a king whose name is unknown and is the largest pyramid at El-Kurru, however, the tomb appears unfinished and unused. It is located just south and adjacent to the pyramid of Piye (K.17)
- Ku.2 – dates to 362-342 BC, belongs to an unknown queen, likely the queen of the unknown king buried in Ku.1.

== Horse burials ==
Some 120 metres (390 ft) to the north-west of pyramids K.51–K.55, four rows of graves were found which contained horse burials (Ku.201-224). The rows contained four, eight, eight, and four graves respectively. The four graves in the first row likely date to the time of Piye, the tombs in the second row date to the time of Shabaka, the tombs in the third row date to the time of Shebitqo, and the tombs in the fourth and last row date to the time of Tantamani.

The tombs had all been robbed, but enough remained to determine that the horses were all buried in an upright position. The horses were buried with all their trappings.

== Recent archaeological work ==
In 2013 archaeological work once again commenced at El-Kurru. In collaboration with the National Council for Antiquities and Museums (NCAM), and partially funded by the Qatar Sudan Archaeological Project (QSAP), Dr. Geoff Emberling (Kelsey Museum of Archaeology, Michigan) and Dr. Rachael J. Dann (Associate Professor, Egyptian & Sudanese Archaeology, University of Copenhagen) co-direct excavation, survey, documentation and conservation work at the site. Much of this work is discussed here: International Kurru Archaeological Project

== Royal cemeteries ==
Other royal cemeteries are located here:

- Nuri
- Gebel Barkal Royal Cemetery
- Bagrawiyah Royal Cemeteries
- Pyramids of Meroe (Begarawiyah)

== Gallery ==
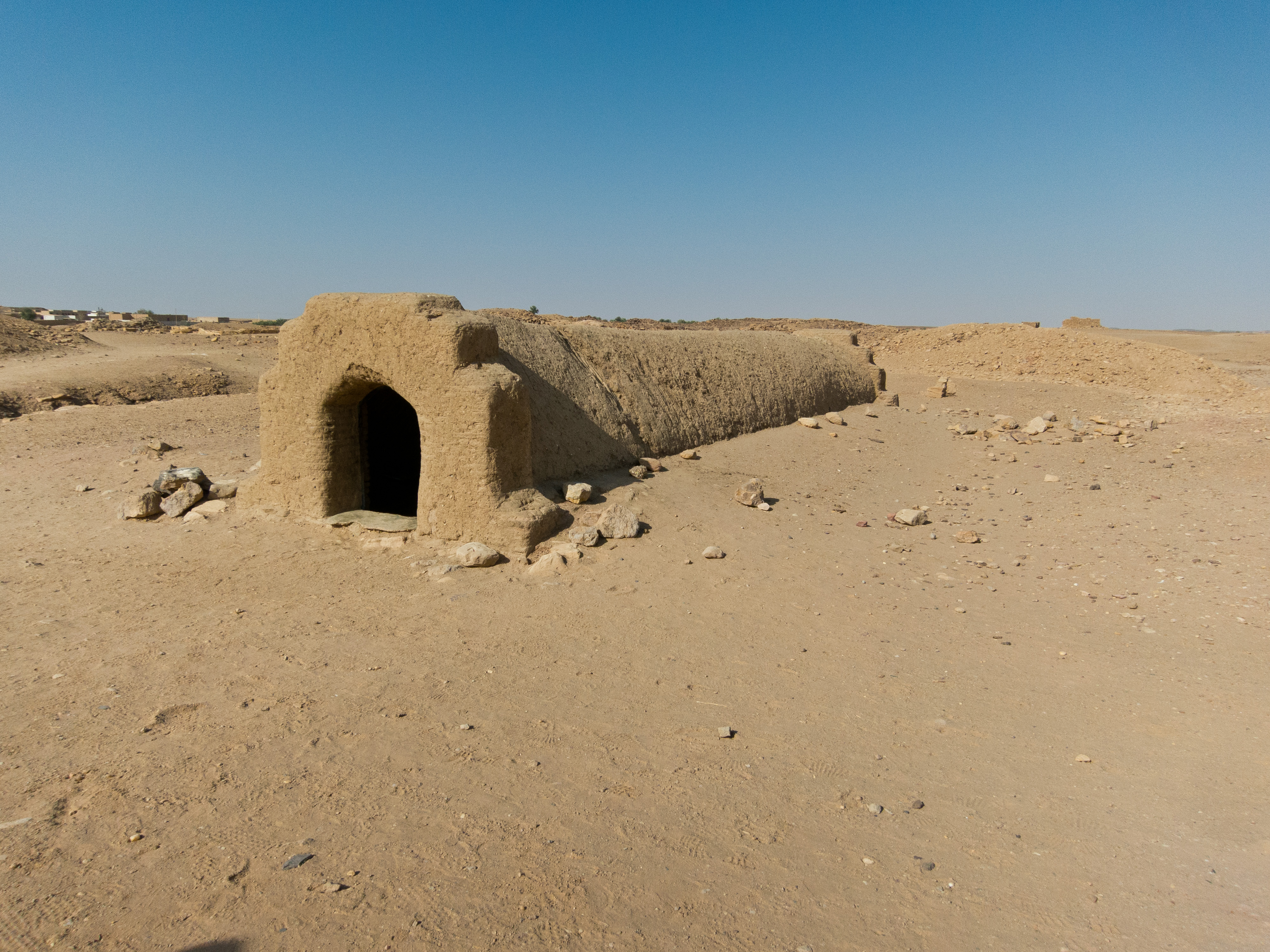
Exterior of one of the ancient Nubian tombs

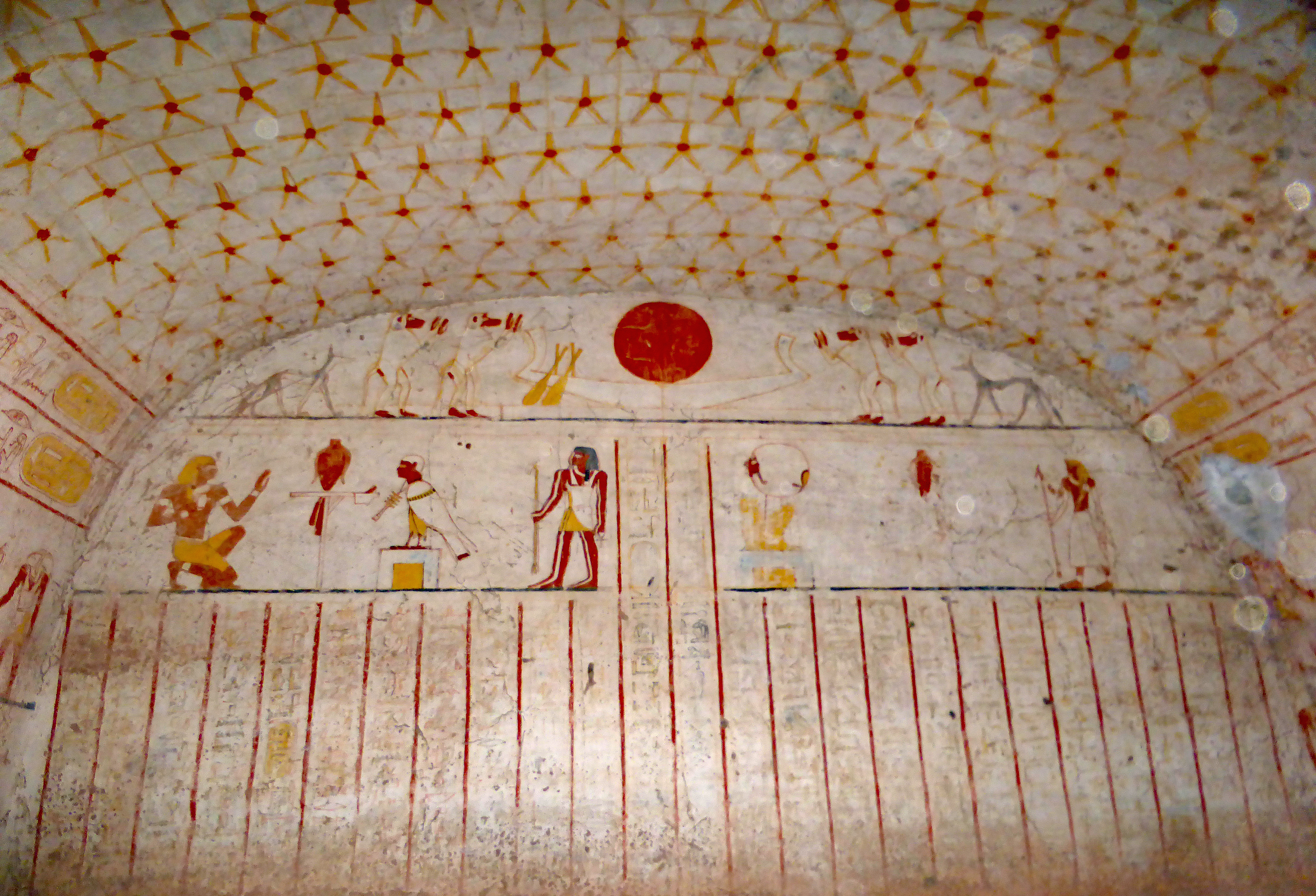
Burial Chamber of the tomb of Tanutamani

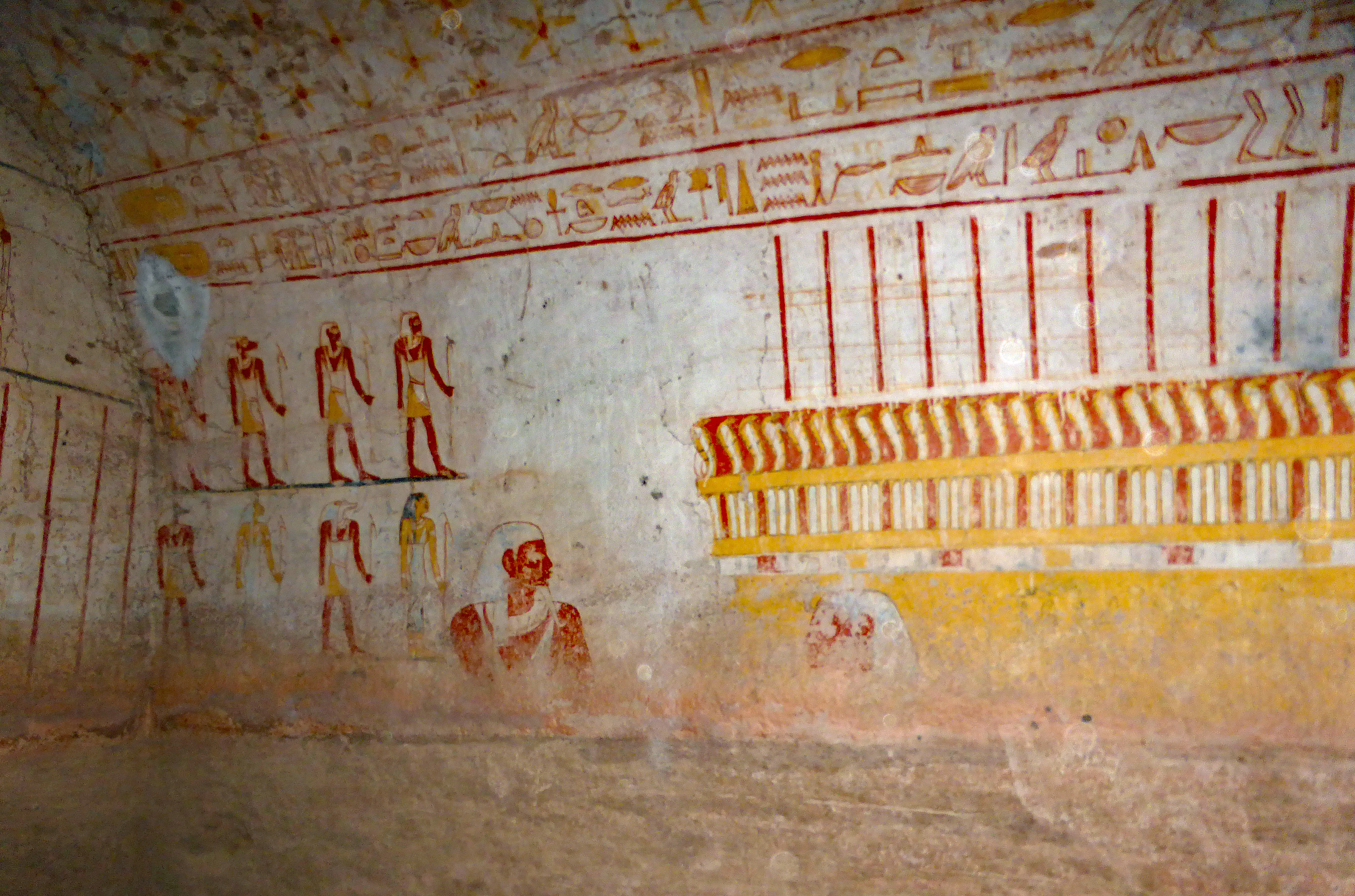
Burial Chamber of the tomb of Tanutamani

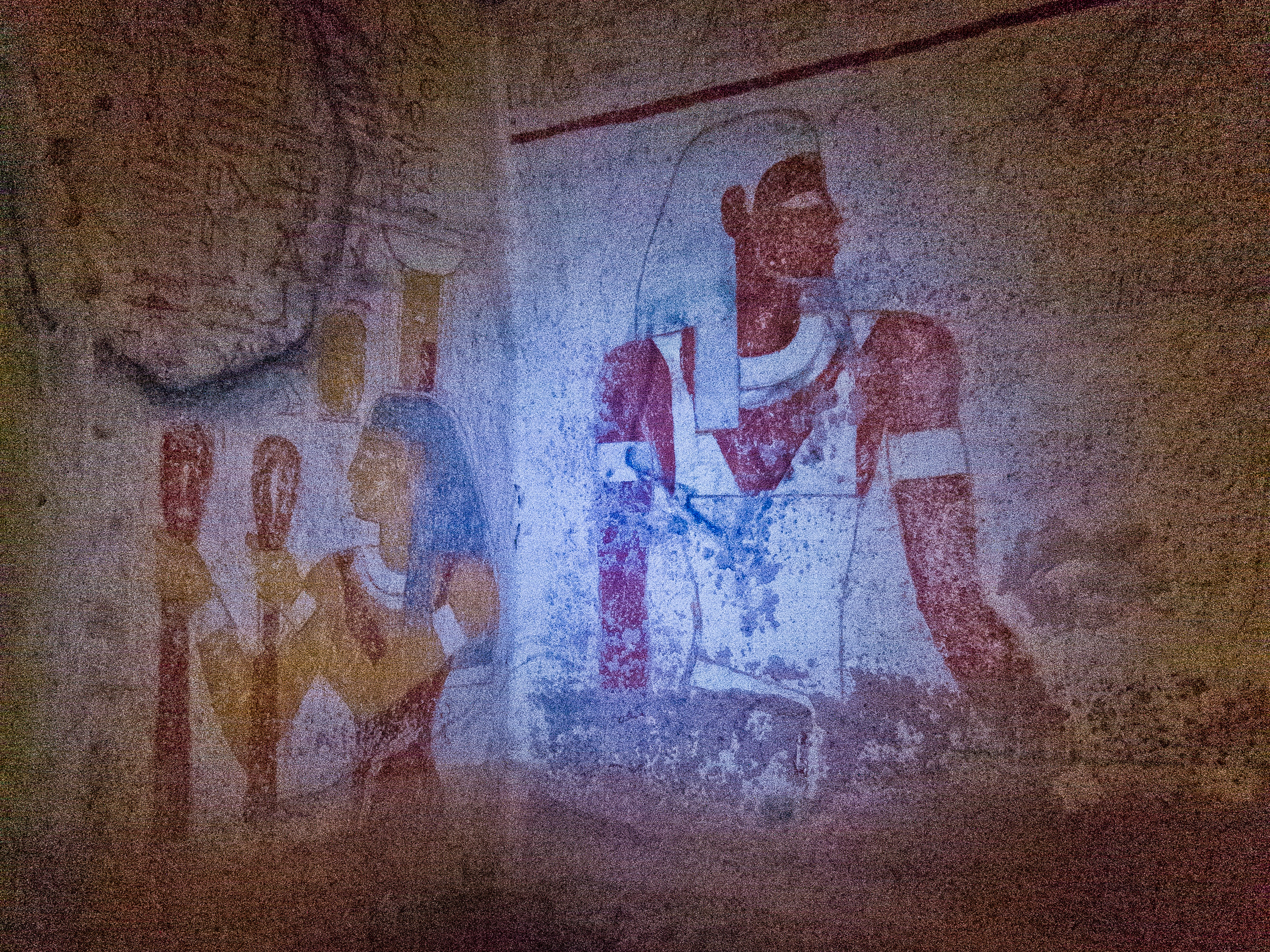
Burial Chamber of the tomb of Tanutamani

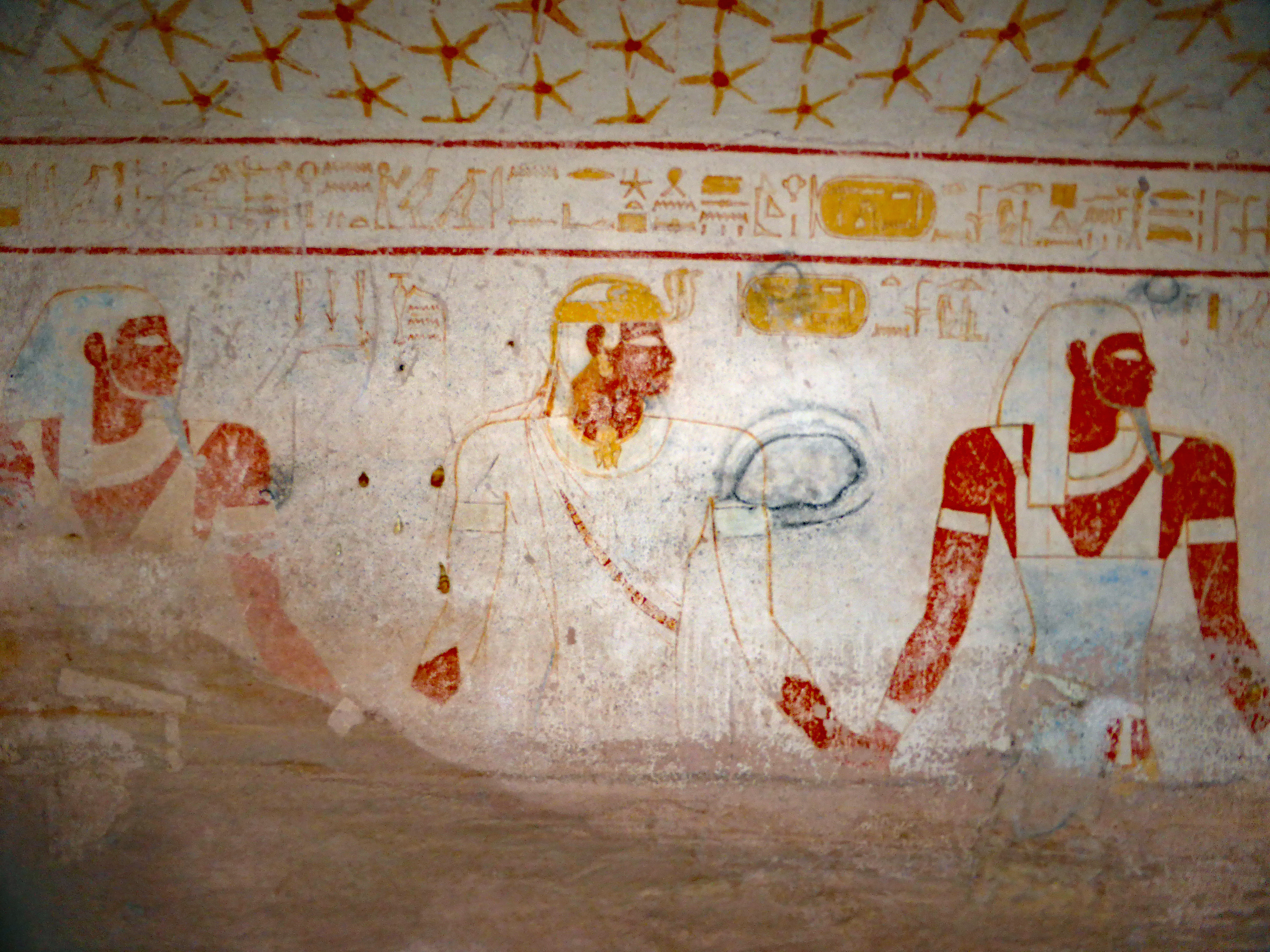
Burial Chamber of the tomb of Tanutamani
