= Qalhata =

- Queen consort of Nubia and Egypt; Great Royal Wife
- Burial: Pyramid in El-Kurru (Ku. 5)
- Spouse: Pharaoh Shabaka
- Issue: King Tantamani
- Dynasty: 25th Dynasty of Egypt
- Father: King Piye

< W11 E23 O4 t N34 >
Qalhata
in hieroglyphs
Era: Late Period
(664–332 BC)

Qalhata was a Nubian queen dated to the Twenty-fifth Dynasty of Egypt.

Qalhata was a daughter of King Piye and a queen consort to her brother Shabaka. She is known from the Dream Stela of King Tantamani and from her pyramid in El-Kurru (Ku. 5).

Assyrian records state that King Tantamani was the son of Taharqa's sister. The tomb of Qalhata at El-Kurru contains texts that say she is a King's Mother, giving some evidence of the family relationships.
