= Noba =

Ambiguous term referring to Nubia

Noba is a term found in a number of historical sources discussing ancient and Medieval Nubia. Its exact meaning is uncertain, with ancient sources themselves seeming confused about the region south of Egypt. Most likely it refers to two separate groups: the Nuba, a people from southeast of Nubia, and a people later known as the Nobatae (Nubians), a group of unknown origin who invaded Nubia during the decline of Meroe, conquered the Kingdom of Kush, most likely founded the kingdoms of Nobatia and Makuria, and gave their name to Nubia itself as well as the Nubian languages. There are mentions of the "black" Noba and the "red " Noba in Axumite sources threatening the Axumite borders which prompts a response by the Axumites to attack Meroe.
