= Kingdom of Kush =

Ancient kingdom in Nubia, Africa

Kingdom of Kush Qes (Meroitic)
- c. 780 BC – c. 350 AD
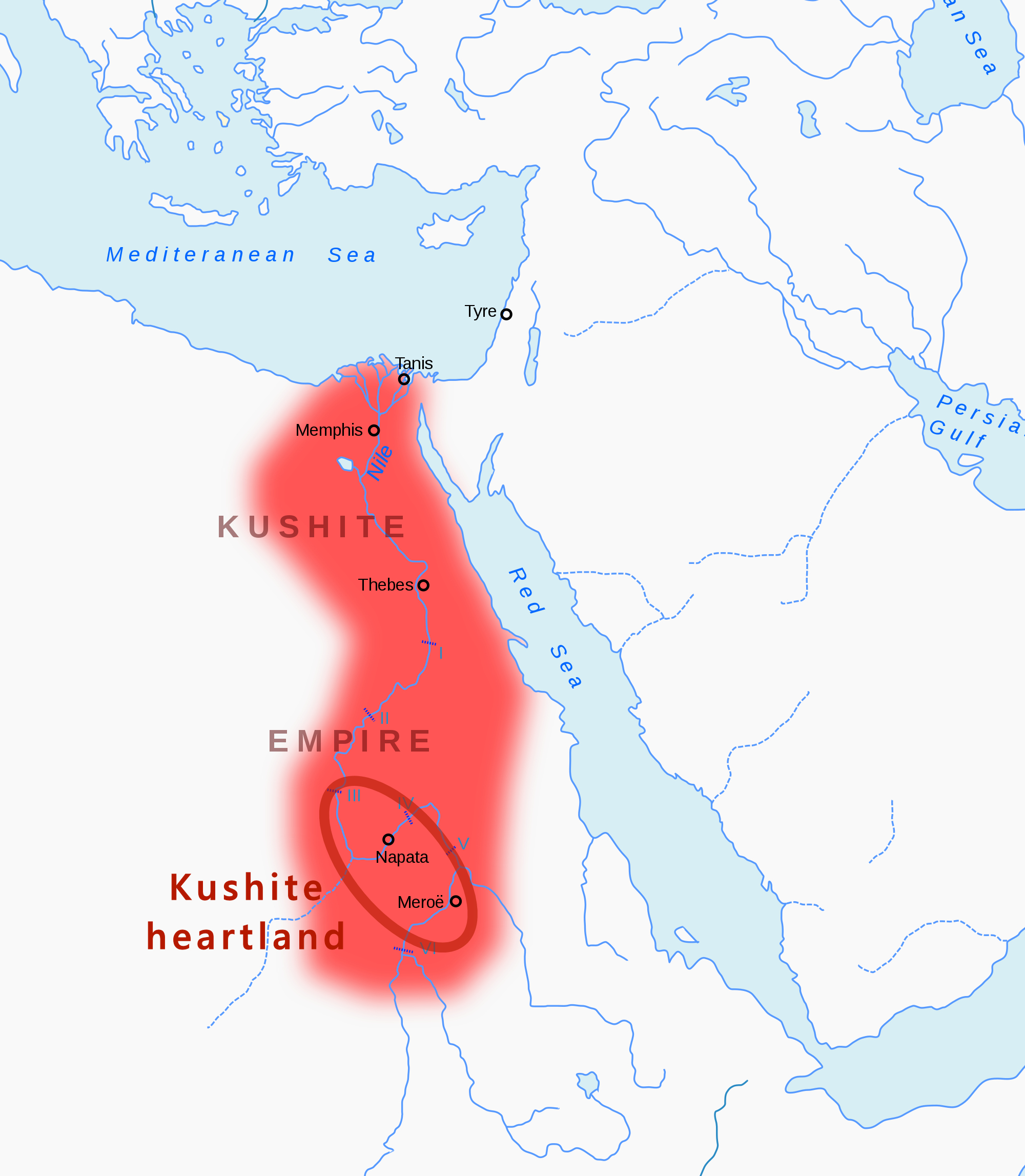
- Kushite heartland, and Kushite Empire of the Twenty-fifth Dynasty of Egypt, c. 700 BC
- Capital: Kerma; Napata; Meroë
- Common languages: Meroitic; Egyptian; Blemmyan; Old Nubian
- Religion: Kushite religion; Ancient Egyptian religion
- Demonym: Kushite
- Government: Monarchy
- Monarch
- Historical era: Bronze Age to Late Antiquity
  - Established: c. 780 BC
  - Capital moved to Meroe: 591 BC
  - Axumite capture of Meroë: 330
  - Disestablished: c. 350 AD

Population
  - Egyptian phase: 100,000
  - Meroite phase: 1,150,000
Preceded by
New Kingdom of Egypt
Succeeded by
Alodia
Makuria
Nobatia
Kingdom of Aksum
Blemmyes
- Today part of: Sudan; Egypt

The Kingdom of Kush, (Note: Pronounced: /kʊʃ, kʌʃ/; Ancient Egyptian: 𓎡𓄿𓈙𓐰𓈉, romanized: kꜣš; Neo-Assyrian Akkadian: 𒆳𒆪𒌋𒋛, romanized: Kūsi; Ancient Greek: Kους, romanized: Kous; or Αἰθιοπία, Aithiopía; Latin: Aethiopia; Coptic: Ⲉϭⲱϣ, romanized: Ečōš; Hebrew: כּוּשׁ, romanized: Kūš) also known as the Kushite Empire, or simply Kush, was an ancient kingdom in Nubia, centered along the Nile Valley in what is now northern Sudan and southern Egypt.

The region of Nubia was an early cradle of civilization, producing several complex societies that engaged in trade and industry. The city-state of Kerma emerged as the dominant political force between 2450 and 1450 BC, controlling the Nile Valley between the first and fourth cataracts, an area as large as Egypt. The Egyptians were the first to identify Kerma as "Kush" probably from the indigenous ethnonym "Kasu", and over the next several centuries the two civilizations engaged in intermittent warfare, trade, and cultural exchange.

Much of Nubia came under Egyptian rule during the New Kingdom period (1550–1070 BC). Following Egypt's disintegration amid the Late Bronze Age collapse, the Kushites reestablished a kingdom in Napata (now modern Karima, Sudan). Though Kush had developed many cultural affinities with Egypt, such as the veneration of Amun, and the royal families of both kingdoms occasionally intermarried, Kushite culture, language and ethnicity was distinct; Egyptian art distinguished the people of Kush by their dress, appearance, and even method of transportation.

In the 8th century BC, King Kashta ("the Kushite") peacefully became king of Upper Egypt, while his daughter, Amenirdis, was appointed as divine adoratrice of Amun in Thebes. His successor Piye invaded Lower Egypt, establishing the Kushite-ruled Twenty-fifth Dynasty. Piye's daughter, Shepenupet II, was also appointed divine adoratrice of Amun. The monarchs of Kush ruled Egypt for over a century until the Assyrian conquest, being dethroned by the Assyrian kings Esarhaddon and Ashurbanipal in the mid-7th century BC. Following the severing of ties with Egypt, the Kushite imperial capital was located at Meroë, during which time it was known by the Greeks as Aethiopia.

The northernmost part of Nubia was occupied from the 3rd century BC to the 3rd century AD, first by the Ptolemaic Kingdom and then by the Roman Empire. At the end of this 600-year period, the territory, known in the Greco-Roman world as Dodekaschoinos, was taken back by the Kushite king Yesebokheamani. The kingdom of Kush persisted as a major regional power until the 4th century AD, when it weakened and disintegrated amid worsening climatic conditions, internal rebellions, and foreign invasions—notably by the Noba people, who introduced the Nubian languages and gave their name to Nubia itself. While the Kushites were occupied by war with the Noba and the Blemmyes, the Aksumites took the opportunity to capture Meroë and loot its gold. Negus Ezana then took on the title of "King of Ethiopia", a practice which would last into the modern period and was recorded in inscriptions found in both Axum and Meroe. Although the Aksumite presence was likely short-lived, it prompted the dissolution of the Kushite kingdom into the three polities of Nobatia, Makuria and Alodia. The Kingdom of Alodia subsequently gained control of the southern territory of the former Meroitic empire, including parts of Eritrea.

Long overshadowed by Egypt, archaeological discoveries since the late 20th century have revealed Kush to be an advanced civilization. The Kushites had their own unique language and script; maintained a complex economy based on trade and industry; mastered archery; and developed a complex, urban society with uniquely high levels of female participation.

== Name ==
Kush in hieroglyphs
k G1 S N25
k3š
Ku'sh

The native name of the kingdom was recorded in Egyptian as kꜣš, likely pronounced [kuɫuʃ] or [kuʔuʃ] in Middle Egyptian, when the term was first used for Nubia, based on the New Kingdom-era Assyrian and Babylonian Akkadian transliteration of the genitive kūsi.

It is also an ethnic term for the native population who initiated the kingdom of Kush. The term is also displayed in the names of Kushite persons, such as King Kashta (a transcription of kꜣš-tꜣ "(one from) the land of Kush"). Geographically, Kush referred to the region south of the first cataract in general. Kush also was the home of the rulers of the 25th Dynasty.

The name Kush, since at least the time of Josephus, has been connected with the biblical character Cush, in the Hebrew Bible (Hebrew: כּוּשׁ), son of Ham (Genesis 10:6). Ham had four sons named: Cush, Put, Canaan, and Mizraim (Hebrew name for Egypt). According to the Bible, Nimrod, a son of Cush, was the founder and king of Babylon, Erech, Akkad and Calneh, in Shinar (Gen 10:10). The Bible also makes reference to someone named Cush who is a Benjamite (Psalms 7:1, KJV).

In Ancient Greek sources Kush was known as Kous (Κους) or Aethiopia (Αἰθιοπία).

== History ==
=== Prelude ===
==== Nabta Playa (7500 BC) ====
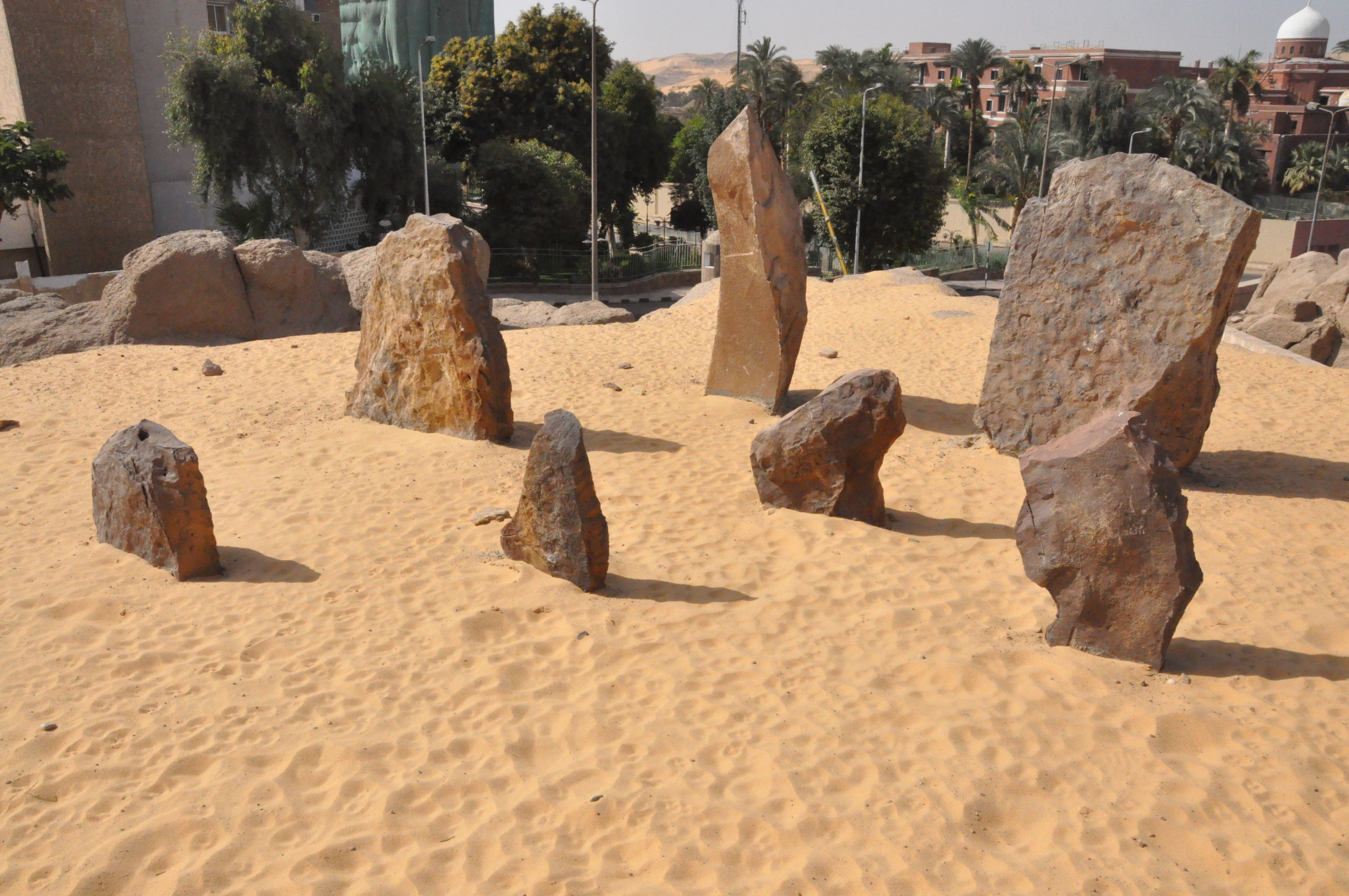
Megaliths from Nabta Playa displayed in the Aswan Nubian museum

The Nabta Playa civilization emerged in Nubia around 7500 BC. Megaliths discovered at Nabta Playa are early examples of what seems to be one of the world's first astronomical devices, predating Stonehenge by almost 2,000 years. Archaeological discoveries reveal that these New Stone Age peoples seem to have lived more organized lives than their contemporaries nearer to and in the Nile Valley. The people of Nabta Playa had villages with 'planned' layouts, with deep wells that held water year-round.

==== A-Group culture (4000–2900 BC) ====
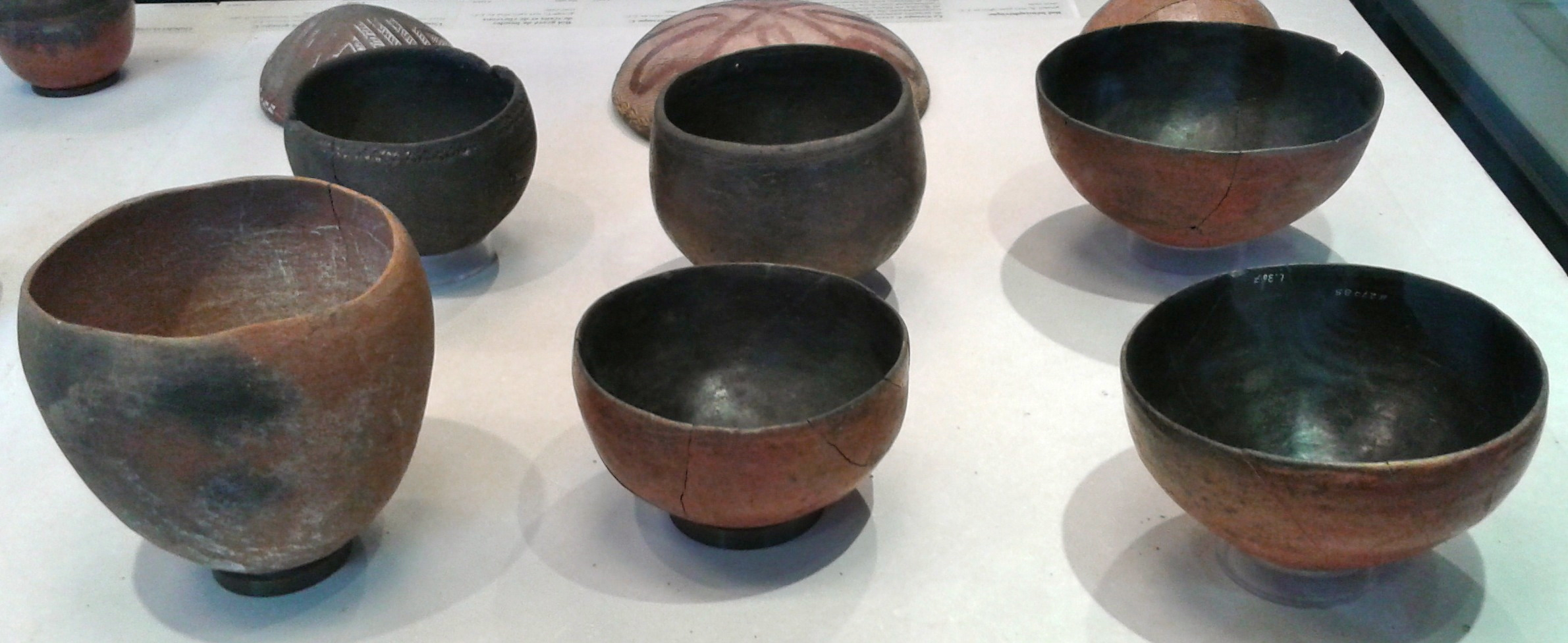
"A-Group" style, Nubian pottery, Musee du Louvre

The A-Group was a civilization in Nubia that lasted from the 4th millennium BC, reached its climax at c. 3100 BC, and fell 200 years later c. 2900 BC. Reisner named this society the A-Group, which is now an outdated archaeological term, but remained in the literature. Early hubs of this civilization included Kubaniyya in the north and Buhen in the south, with Aswan, Sayala, Toshka and Qustul in between.

==== Kerma culture (2500–1500 BC) ====
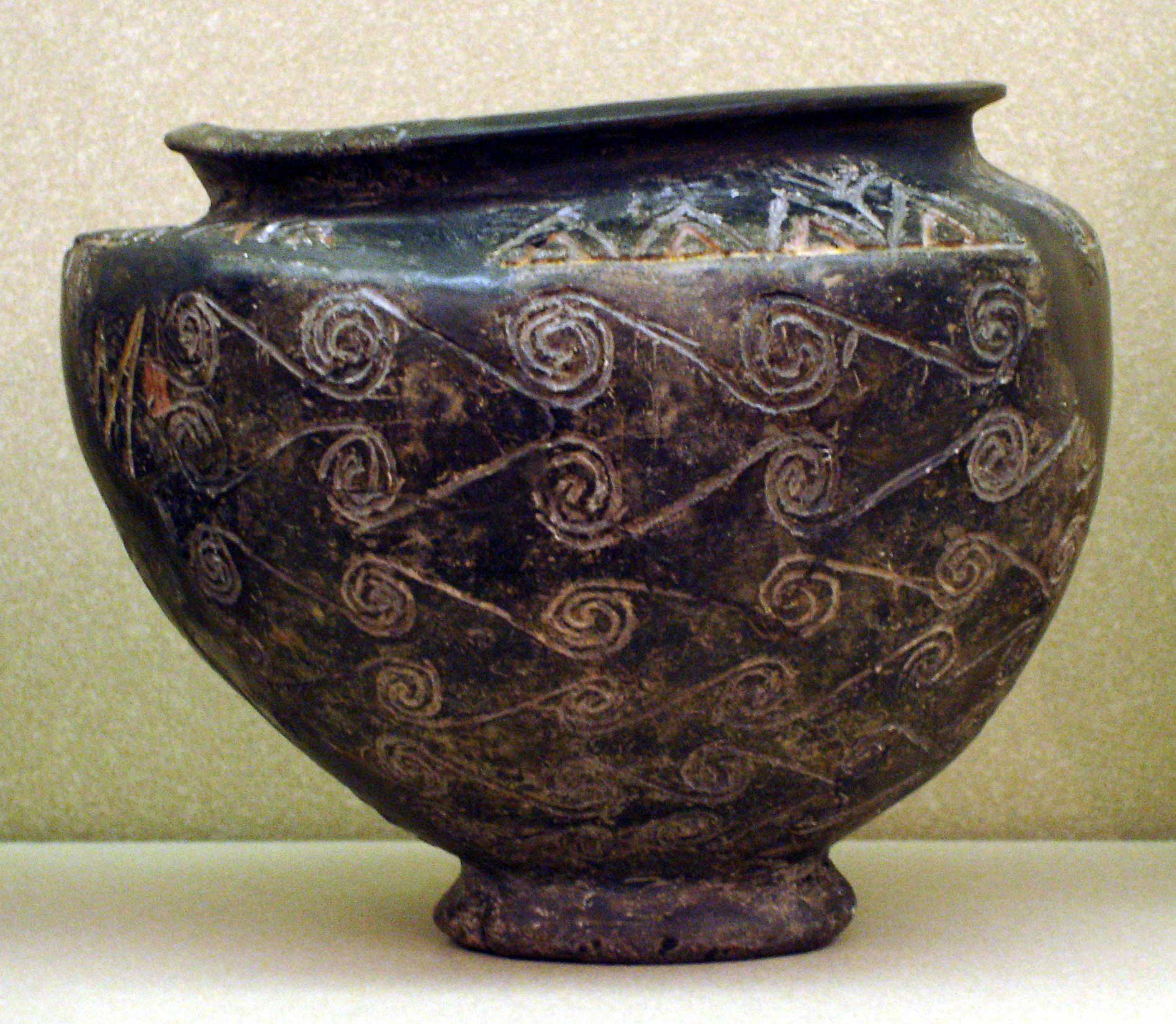
Kerma bowl, 1700-1550 BC. Museum of Fine Arts, Boston

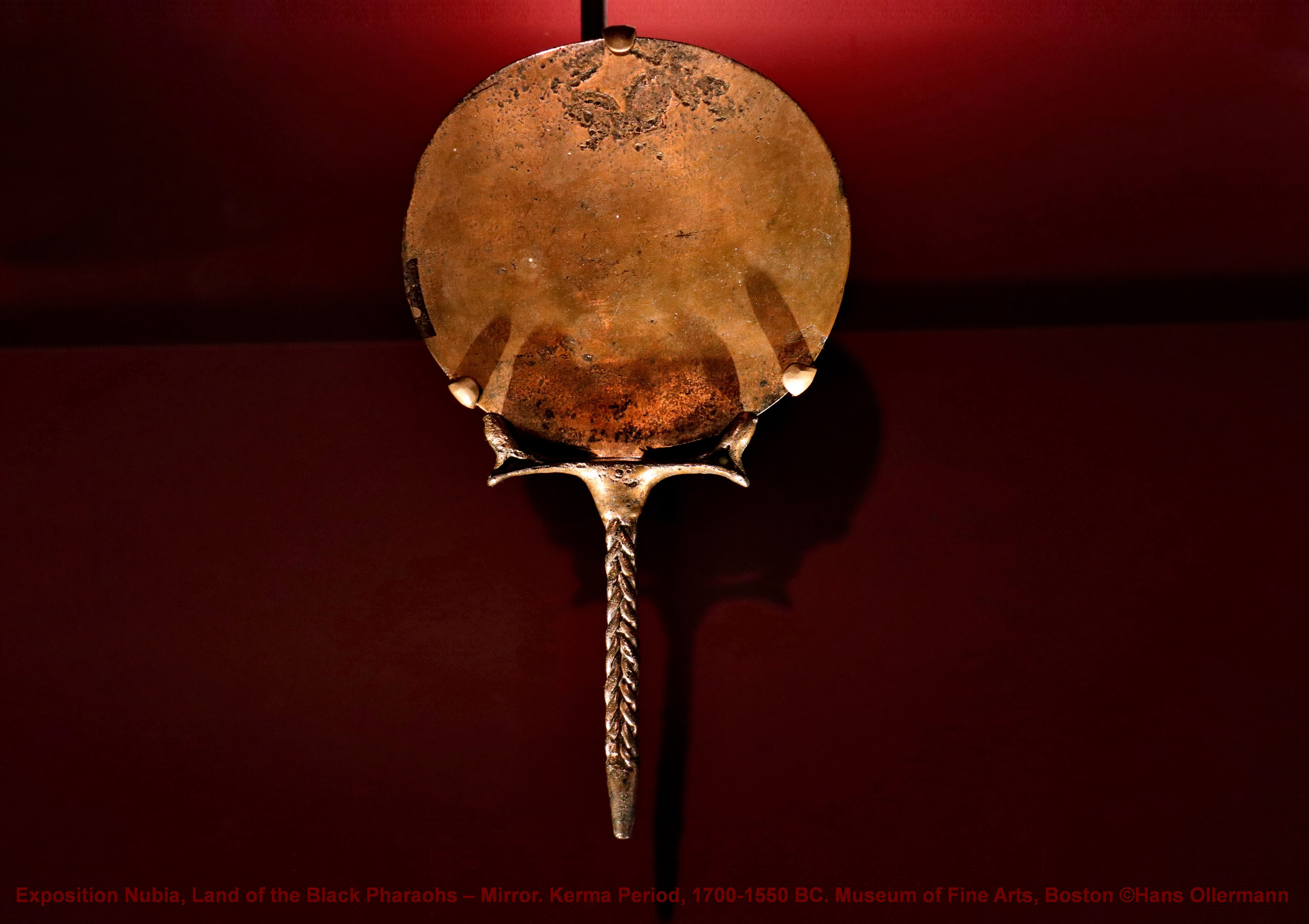
Mirror. End of Kerma Period, 1700-1550 BC. Museum of Fine Arts, Boston

The Kerma culture was a civilization centered in Kerma, Sudan. It flourished from around 2500 BC to 1500 BC in ancient Nubia. The Kerma culture was based in the southern part of Nubia, or "Upper Nubia" (in parts of present-day northern and central Sudan), and later extended its reach northward into Lower Nubia and the border of Egypt. The polity seems to have been one of several Nile Valley states during the Middle Kingdom of Egypt. In the Kingdom of Kerma's latest phase, lasting from about 1700–1500 BC, it absorbed the Sudanese kingdom of Saï and became a sizable, populous empire rivaling Egypt.

Doukki Gel was a settlement near Kerma, Doukki Gel was inhabited between 1800 BC to 400 AD and was occupied by a coalition of African rulers from the south around 1700 BC during the Classical Kerma period, and later by Ancient Egyptian and Nubian officials during the new kingdom period. The settlement is located less than 1 kilometre (0.62 mi) south of the city of Kerma, and shows distinctive Sub Saharan influences architecturally distinct from Kerma with more rounded structures.

==== Egyptian Nubia (1504–1070 BC) ====
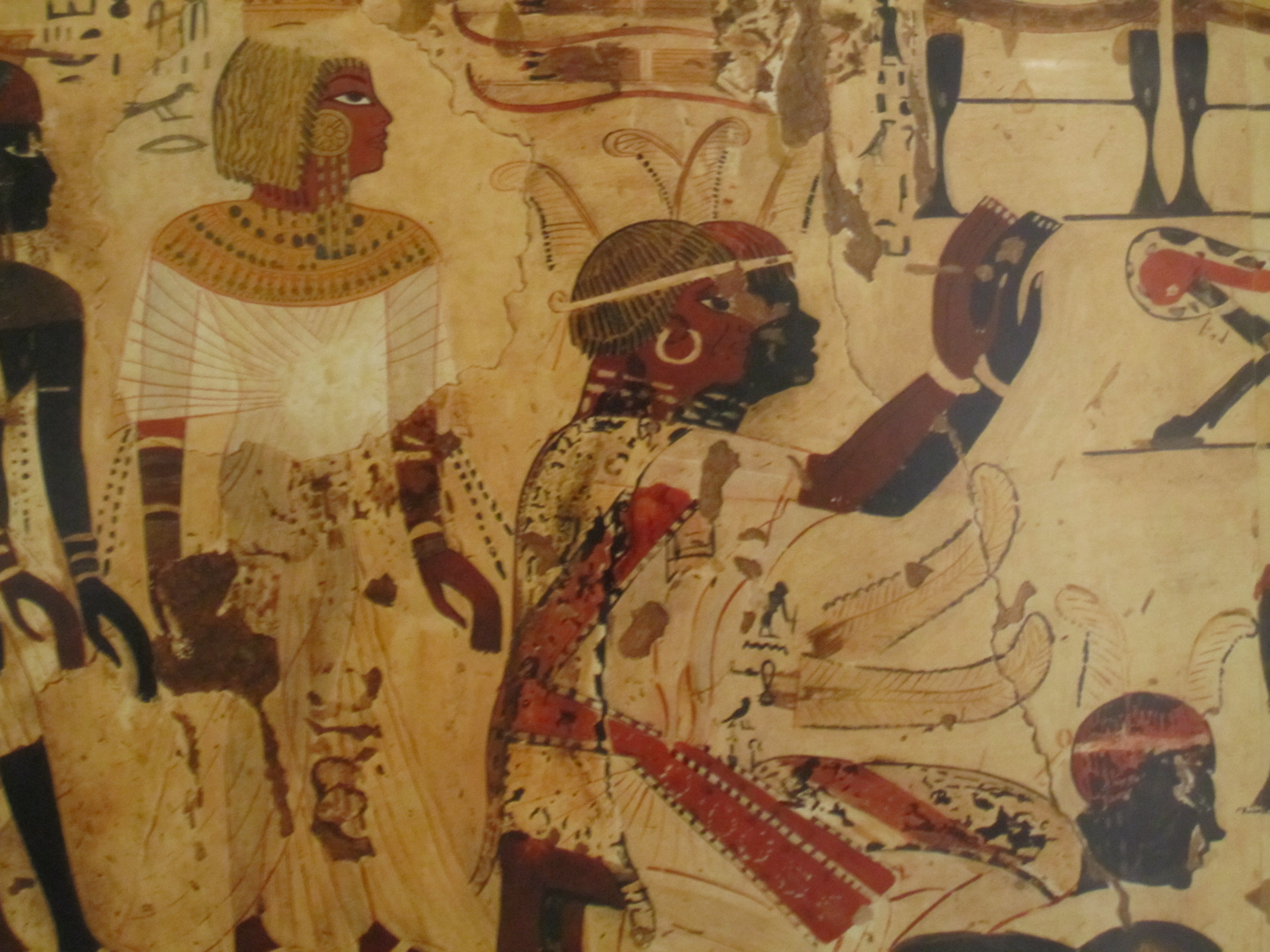
Nubian Prince Heqanefer bringing tribute for The Egyptian King Tutankhamun, 18th dynasty, Tomb of Huy. c. 1342 – c. 1325 BC

Mentuhotep II, the 21st century BC founder of the Middle Kingdom, is recorded to have undertaken campaigns against Kush in the 29th and 31st years of his reign. This is the earliest Egyptian reference to Kush; the Nubian region had gone by other names in the Old Kingdom. Under Thutmose I, Egypt made several campaigns south.

The Egyptians ruled Kush in the New kingdom beginning when the Egyptian King Thutmose I occupied Kush and destroyed its capital, Kerma.

This eventually resulted in their annexation of Nubia c. 1504 BC. Around 1500 BC, Nubia was absorbed into the New Kingdom of Egypt, but rebellions continued for centuries. After the conquest, Kerma culture was increasingly Egyptianized, yet rebellions continued for 220 years until c. 1300 BC. Nubia nevertheless became a key province of the New Kingdom, economically, politically, and spiritually. Indeed, major pharaonic ceremonies were held at Jebel Barkal near Napata. As an Egyptian colony from the 16th century BC, Nubia ("Kush") was governed by an Egyptian Viceroy of Kush.

Resistance to the early eighteenth Dynasty Egyptian rule by neighboring Kush is evidenced in the writings of Ahmose, son of Ebana, an Egyptian warrior who served under Nebpehtrya Ahmose (1539–1514 BC), Djeserkara Amenhotep I (1514–1493 BC), and Aakheperkara Thutmose I (1493–1481 BC). At the end of the Second Intermediate Period (mid-sixteenth century BC), Egypt faced the twin existential threats—the Hyksos in the North and the Kushites in the South. Taken from the autobiographical inscriptions on the walls of his tomb-chapel, the Egyptians undertook campaigns to defeat Kush and conquer Nubia under the rule of Amenhotep I (1514–1493 BC). In Ahmose's writings, the Kushites are described as archers, "Now after his Majesty had slain the Bedoin of Asia, he sailed upstream to Upper Nubia to destroy the Nubian bowmen." The tomb writings contain two other references to the Nubian bowmen of Kush. By 1200 BC, Egyptian involvement in the Dongola Reach was nonexistent.

Egypt's international prestige had declined considerably towards the end of the Third Intermediate Period. Its historical allies, the inhabitants of Canaan, had fallen to the Middle Assyrian Empire (1365–1020 BC), and then the resurgent Neo-Assyrian Empire (935–605 BC). The Assyrians, from the tenth century BC onwards, had once more expanded from northern Mesopotamia, and conquered a vast empire, including the whole of the Near East, and much of Anatolia, the eastern Mediterranean, the Caucasus and early Iron Age Iran.

According to Josephus Flavius, the biblical Moses led the Egyptian army in a siege of the Kushite city of Meroe. To end the siege Princess Tharbis was given to Moses as a (diplomatic) bride, and thus the Egyptian army retreated back to Egypt.

=== Formation (c. 1070–754 BC) ===
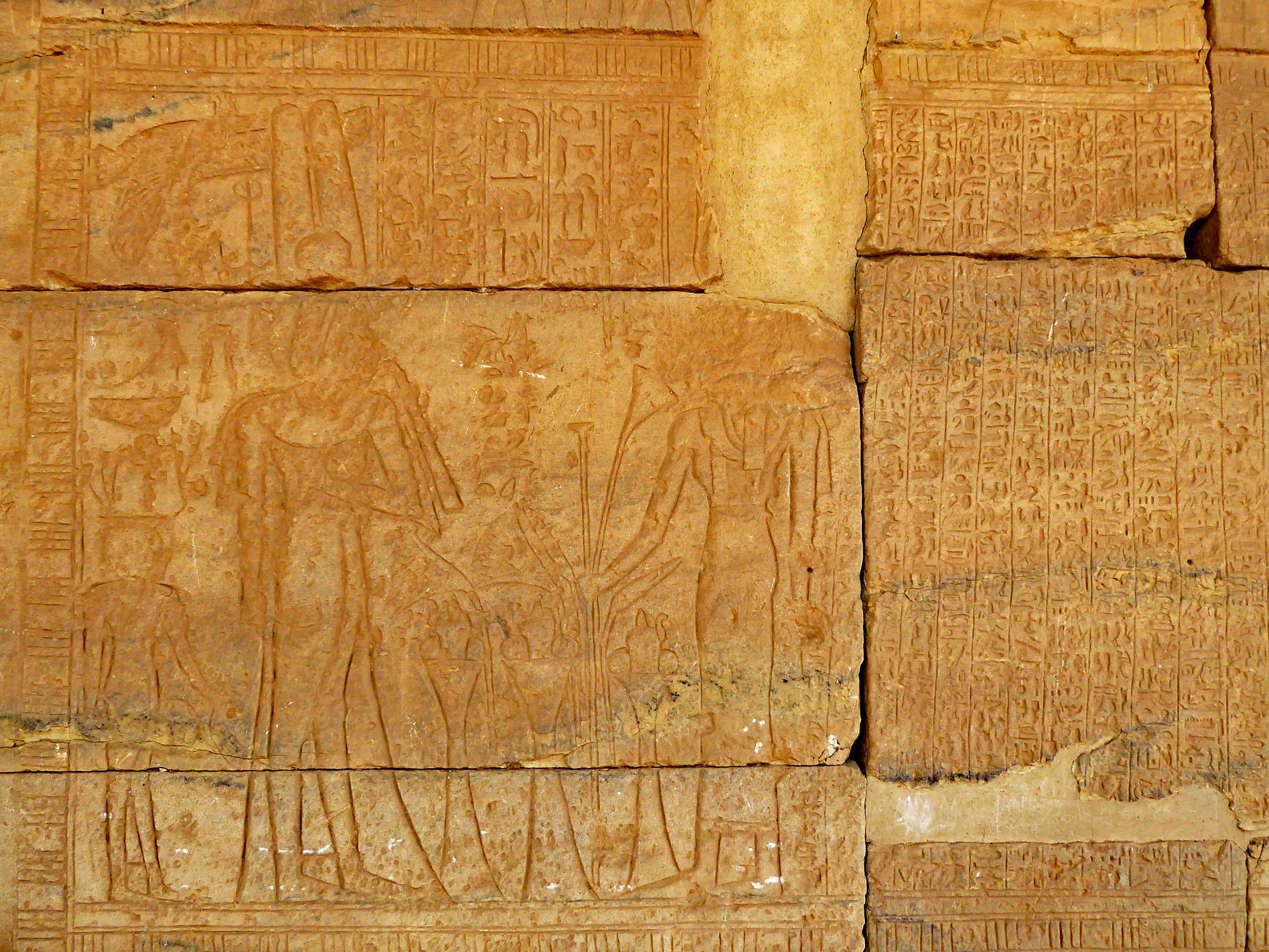
Relief from the temple of Semna depicting queen-king Karimala approaching Isis, 10th–9th century BC

With the disintegration of the New Kingdom around 1070 BC, Kush became an independent kingdom centered at Napata in modern northern Sudan. This more-Egyptianized "Kingdom of Kush" emerged, possibly from Kerma, and regained the region's independence from Egypt. The extent of cultural/political continuity between the Kerma culture and the chronologically succeeding Kingdom of Kush is difficult to determine. The latter polity began to emerge around 1000 BC, 500 years after the end of the Kingdom of Kerma.

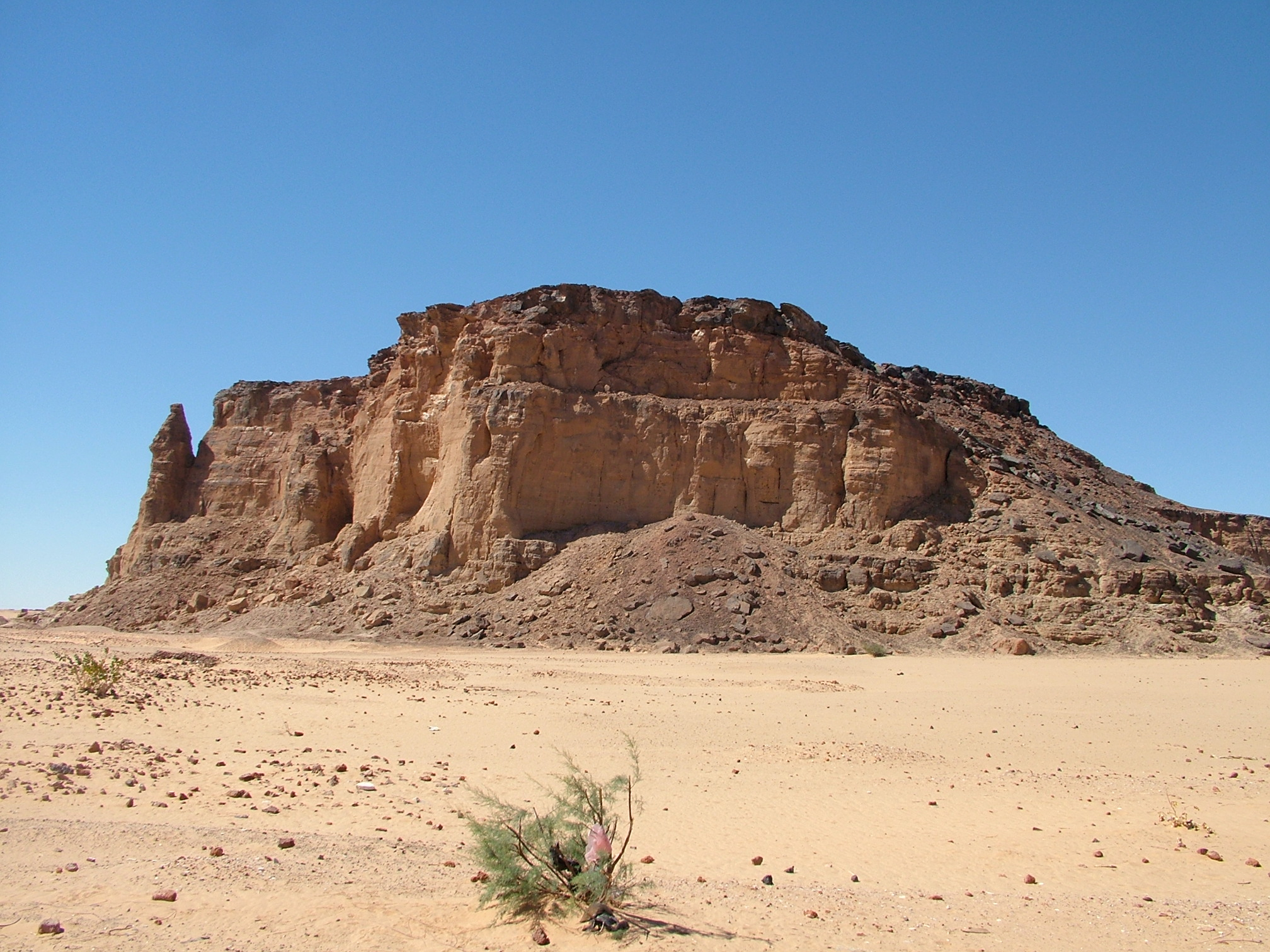
Jebel Barkal was venerated as residence of Amun and became an essential symbol of Kushite kingship.

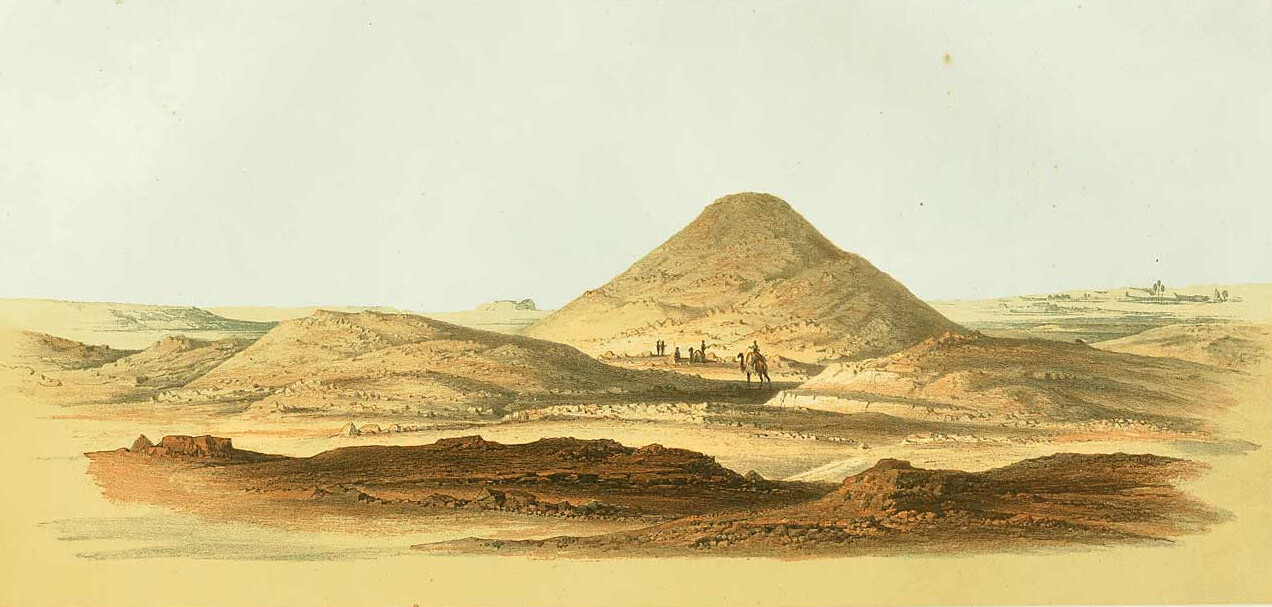
The pyramids of el-Kurru after Carl Richard Lepsius, 1859

The first Kushite king known by name was Alara, who ruled somewhere between 800 and 760 BC. No contemporary inscriptions of him exist. He was first mentioned in the funerary stela of his daughter Tabiry, the wife of king Piye. Later royal inscriptions remember Alara as the founder of the dynasty, some calling him "chieftain", others "king". A 7th century inscription claimed that his sister was the grandmother of king Taharqo. An inscription of the 5th century king Amanineteyerike remembered Alara's reign as long and successful. Alara was probably buried at el-Kurru, although there exists no inscription to identify his tomb. It has been proposed that it was Alara who turned Kush from a chiefdom to an Egyptianized kingdom centered around the cult of Amun.

=== Rule over Egypt (754–656 BC) ===
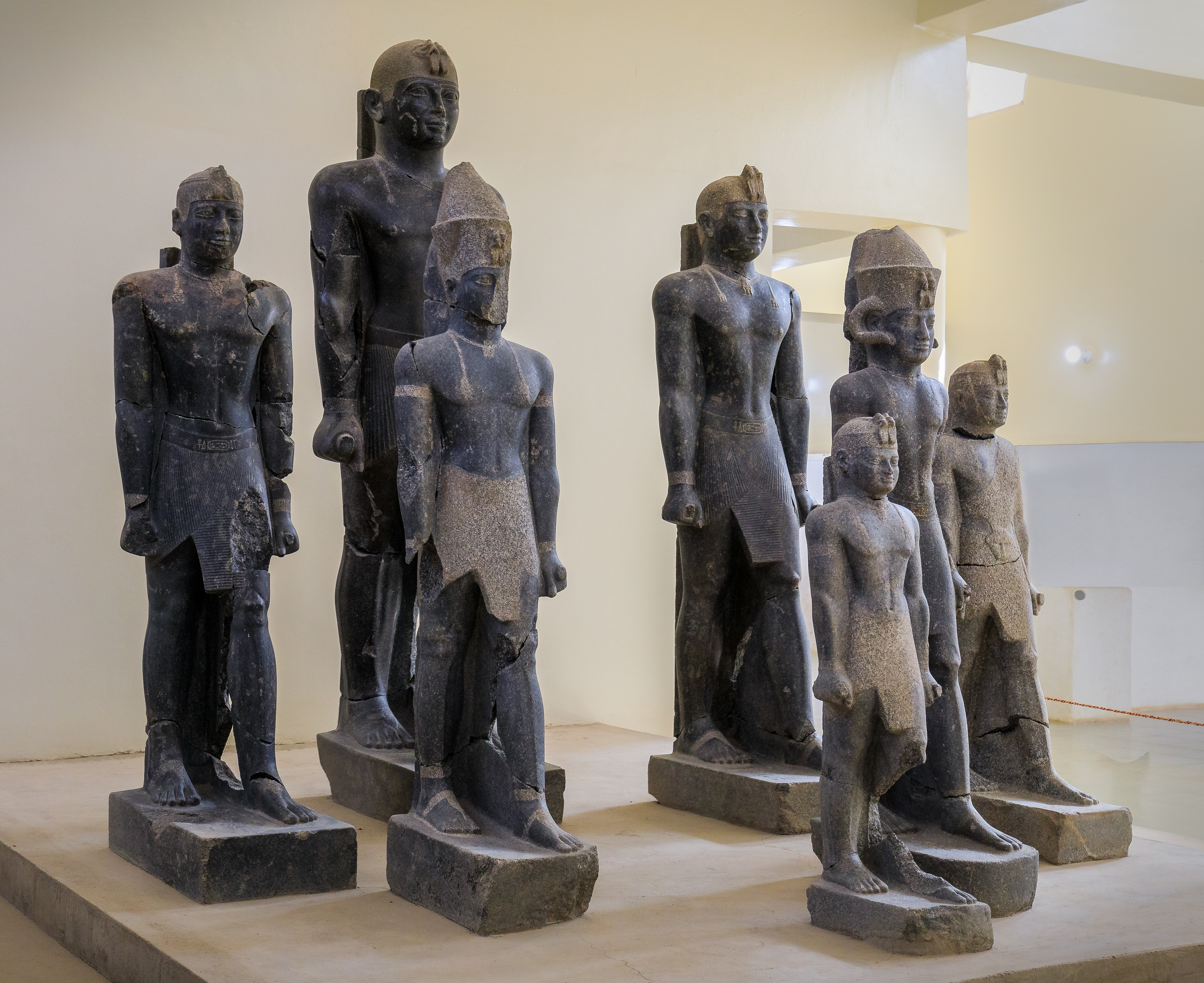
Statues of various rulers of the late 25th Dynasty–early Napatan period: Tantamani, Taharqa (rear), Senkamanisken, again Tantamani (rear), Aspelta, Anlamani, again Senkamanisken. Kerma Museum.

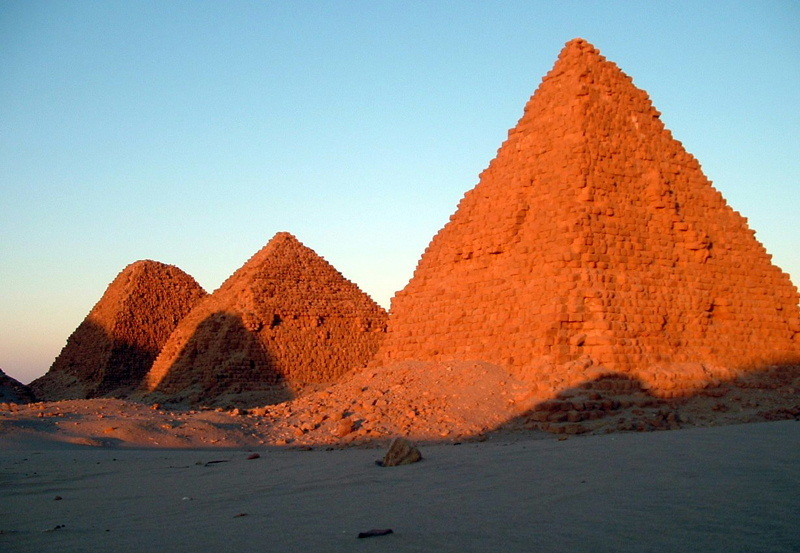
Pyramids of Nuri, built between the reigns of Taharqa (c. 670 BC) and Nastasen (c. 310 BC)

Alara's successor Kashta extended Kushite control north to Elephantine and Thebes in Upper Egypt. Kashta's successor Piye seized control of Lower Egypt around 727 BC. Piye's Victory Stela, celebrating these campaigns between 728 and 716 BC, was found in the Amun temple at Jebel Barkal. He invaded an Egypt fragmented into four kingdoms, ruled by King Peftjauawybast, King Nimlot, King Iuput II, and King Osorkon IV. Piye then sought to support anti-Assyrian rebellions in the southern Levant, however these were decisively put down by the Assyrian king Sargon II in 720 BC.

Why the Kushites chose to enter Egypt at this crucial point of foreign domination is subject to debate. Archaeologist Timothy Kendall offers his own hypotheses, connecting it to a claim of legitimacy associated with Jebel Barkal. Kendall cites the Victory Stele of Piye at Jebel Barkal, which states that "Amun of Napata granted me to be ruler of every foreign country", and "Amun in Thebes granted me to be ruler of the Black Land (Kmt)". According to Kendall, "foreign lands" in this regard seems to include Lower Egypt while "Kmt" seems to refer to a united Upper Egypt and Nubia.

Piye's successor, Shabataka, defeated the Saite kings of northern Egypt between 711 and 710 BC and installed himself as king in Memphis. He then suppoted another rebellion against the Assyrians in the Levant, but this met with failure. He later established ties with Sargon II of the Neo-Assyrian Empire, even sending him Iamani, the rebel ruler of Ashdod as a placatory gesture after Iamani had fled into Egypt. After the reign of Shabaka, Pharaoh Taharqa's army. claimed to have undertook successful military campaigns, as attested by the "list of conquered Asiatic principalities" from the Mut temple at Karnak and "conquered peoples and countries (Libyans, Shasu nomads, Phoenicians?, Khor in Palestine)" from Sanam temple inscriptions. However the regions in the southern Levant claimed by Shabataka were seen by Assyria as under their dominion, and imperial ambitions of both the Mesopotamian based Neo-Assyrian Empire and Kushite Empire made war with the 25th dynasty inevitable. In 701 BC, Taharqa and his army aided Judah and King Hezekiah in withstanding a siege by King Sennacherib of the Assyrians (2 Kings 19:9; Isaiah 37:9). There are various theories (Taharqa's army, disease, divine intervention, Hezekiah's surrender or agreeing to pay tribute) as to why the Assyrians failed to take the city. Historian László Török mentions that Egypt's army "was beaten at Eltekeh" under Taharqa's command, but "the battle could be interpreted as a victory for the double kingdom", since Assyria did not take Jerusalem, however, Assyrian records show Judah forced to pay tribute, the Egyptian and Kushite forces withdrew to Egypt and the Assyrian king Sennacherib appears to have advanced south and occupied part of the Sinai.

The power of the 25th Dynasty reached a climax under Taharqa. The Nile valley empire was as large as it had been since the New Kingdom. New prosperity revived Egyptian culture. Religion, the arts, and architecture were restored to their glorious Old, Middle, and New Kingdom forms. The Kushite pharaohs built or restored temples and monuments throughout the Nile valley, including Memphis, Karnak, Kawa, and Jebel Barkal. It was during the 25th dynasty that the Nile valley saw the first widespread construction of pyramids (many in modern Sudan) since the Middle Kingdom. The Kushites developed their own script, the Meroitic alphabet, which was influenced by Egyptian writing systems c. 700–600 BC, although it appears to have been wholly confined to the royal court and major temples.

==== Assyrian conquest of Egypt ====
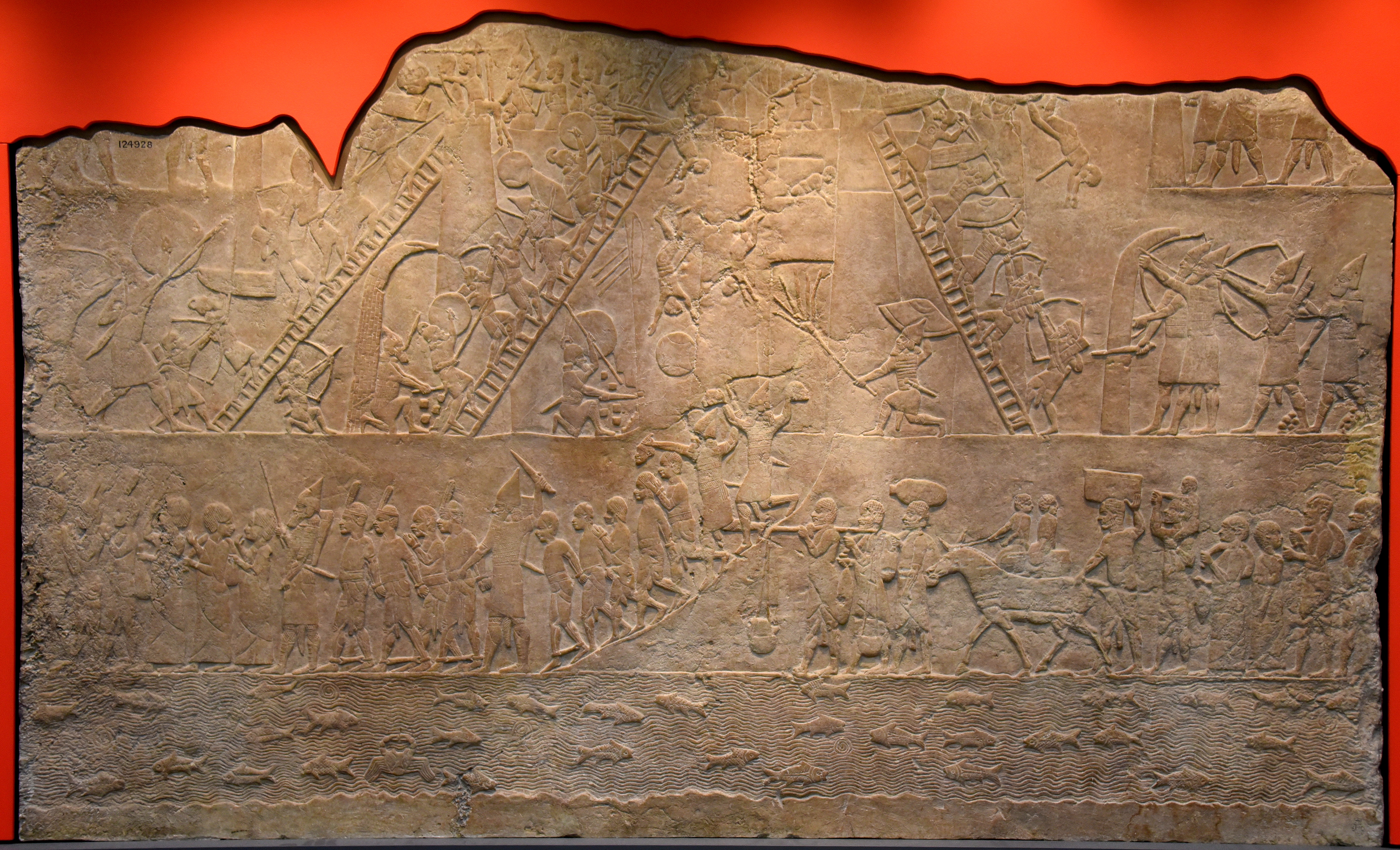
Wall panel depicting Assyrian soldiers storming a Kushite fortress in Egypt. Niniveh, Iraq.

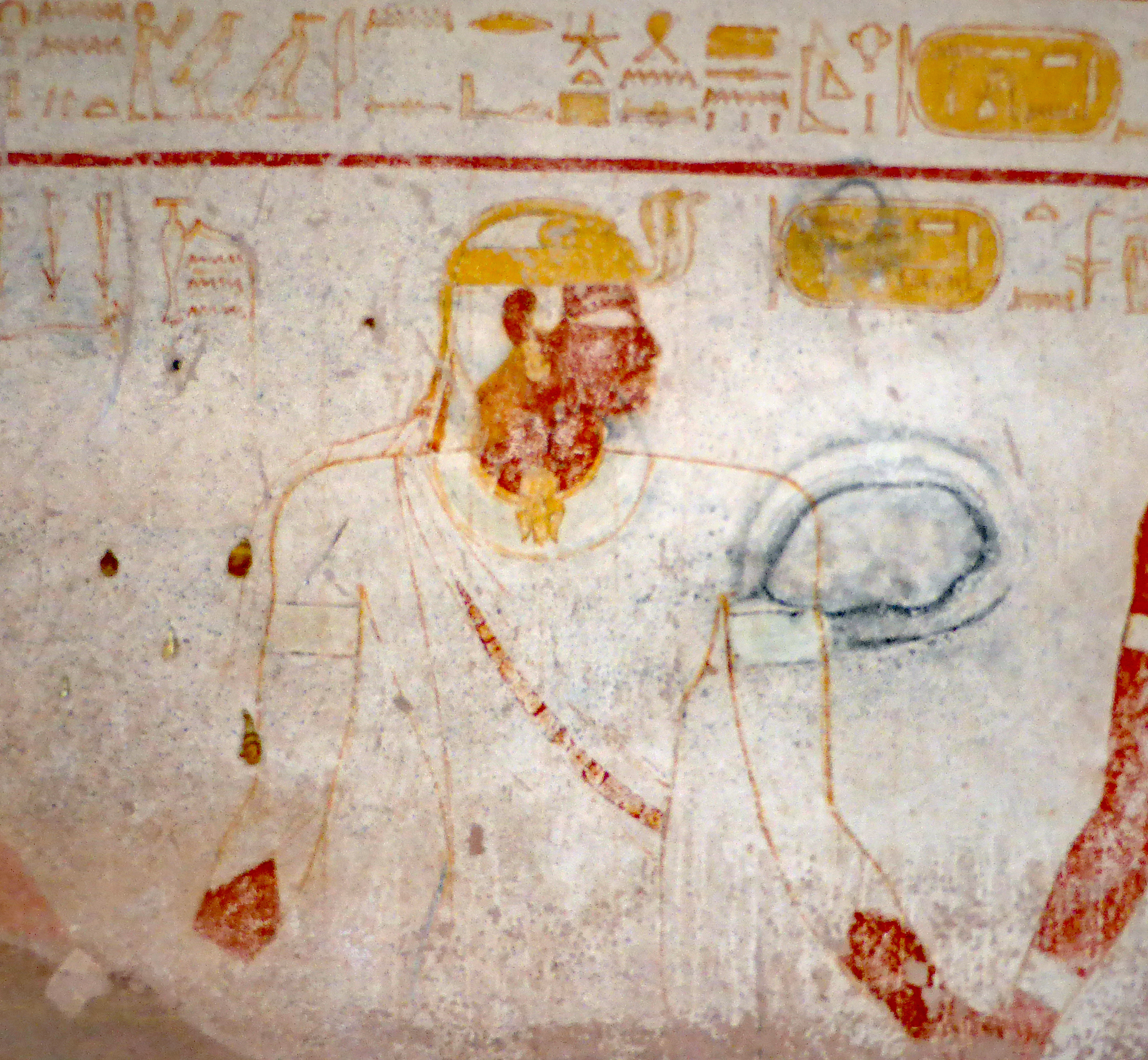
Wall painting of king Tantamani from his tomb in el-Kurru, under whom Egypt was lost for good

Taharqa and his Judean allies initially held the Assyrians at Ashkelon when war broke out in 674 BC. The relatively small Assyrian force had first defeafed Canaanite, Aramean and Arab tribes in the region and then immediately marched at great speed on Ashkelon, leaving them exhausted and unable to advance further. However, in 671 BC, the Assyrian King Esarhaddon started the Assyrian conquest of Egypt with a larger and better prepared force. The Assyrians advanced rapidly and decisively. Memphis was taken, and Taharqa fled back to Nubia, while his heir and other family members were taken to the Assyrian capital Nineveh as prisoners. Esarhaddon boasted how he "deported all Aethiopians from Egypt, leaving not one to pay homage to me". However, the native Egyptian vassal rulers installed by Esarhaddon as puppets were unable to effectively retain full control of the entire country, and Taharqa was able to regain control of Memphis. Esarhaddon's 669 BC campaign to once more eject Taharqa was abandoned when Esarhaddon died in the northern Assyrian city of Harran on the way to Egypt, leaving Esarhaddon's successor Ashurbanipal the task. He defeated Taharqa, driving his forces back into Nubia, and Taharqa died in Napata soon after in 664 BC.

Taharqa's successor, Tantamani sailed north from Napata, through Elephantine, and to Thebes with a large army, where he was "ritually installed as the king of Egypt". From Thebes, Tantamani began his attempt at reconquest and regained control of a part of southern Egypt as far as Memphis from the native Egyptian puppet rulers installed by the Assyrians. Tantamani's dream stele states that he restored order from the chaos, where royal temples and cults were not being maintained. After defeating Sais and killing Assyria's vassal, Necho I, in Memphis, "some local dynasts formally surrendered, while others withdrew to their fortresses". Tantamani proceeded north of Memphis, invading Lower Egypt and, besieged cities in the Delta, a number of which surrendered to him. The Assyrians, who had maintained only a small military presence in the north, then sent a large army southwards in 663 BC. Tantamani was decisively routed, and the Assyrian army sacked Thebes to such an extent it never truly recovered. Tantamani was chased back to Nubia, but he continued to try and assert control over Upper Egypt until c. 656 BC. At this date, a native Egyptian ruler, Psamtik I son of Necho, placed on the throne as a vassal of Ashurbanipal, took control of Thebes. The last links between Kush and Upper Egypt were severed after hostilities with the Saite kings in the 590s BC.

=== Napatan period (656 BC – c. 270 BC) ===
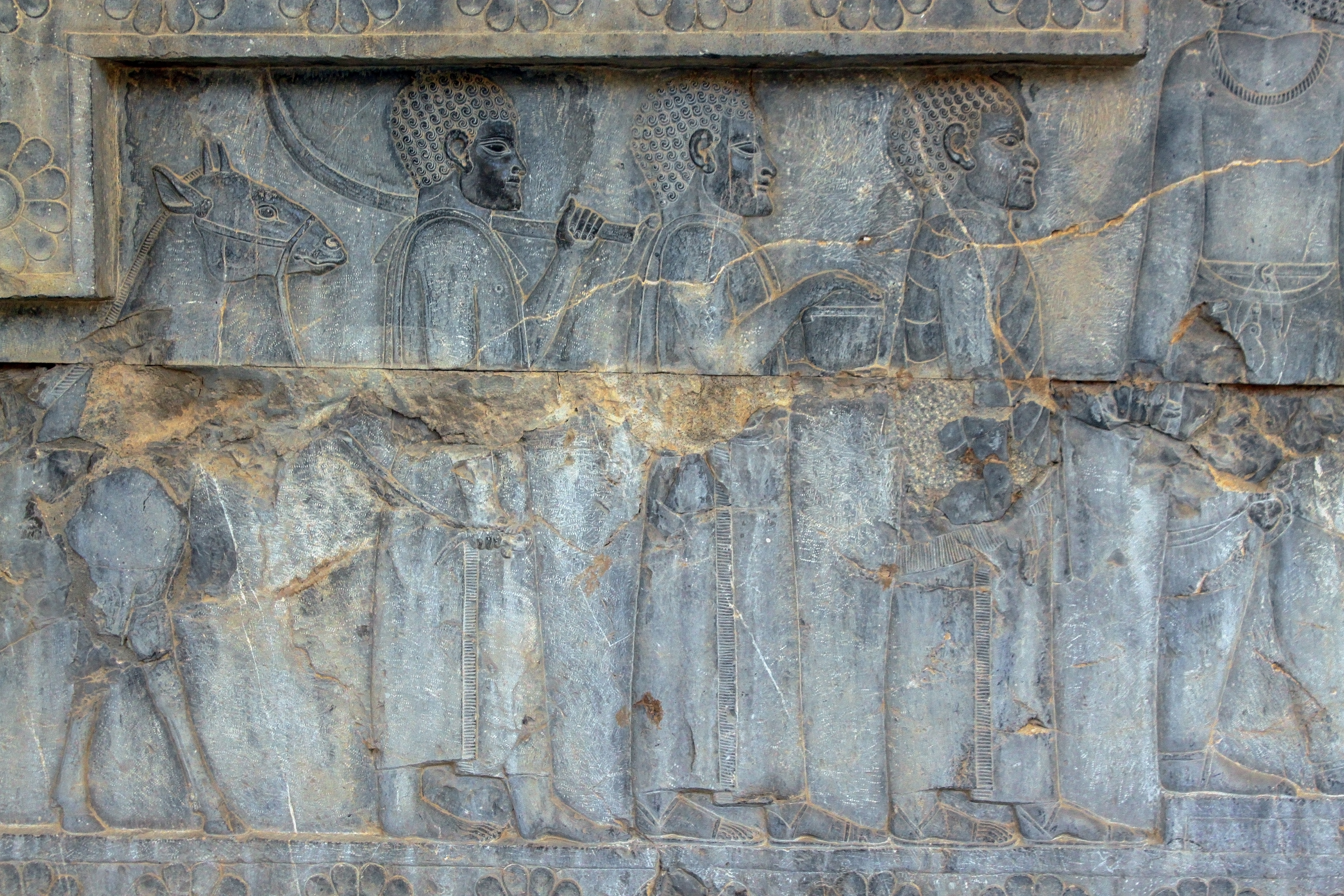
Kushite delegation on a Persian relief from the Apadana palace (c. 500 BC)

Kushite civilization continued for several centuries. According to Welsby, "throughout the Saite, Persian, Ptolemaic, and Roman periods, the Kushite rulers—the descendants of the XXVth Dynasty pharaohs, and the guardians of the Temple of Amun at Jebel Barkal—could have pressed their 'legitimate' claim for control of Egypt and they thus posed a potential threat to the rulers of Egypt."

Herodotus mentioned an invasion of Kush by the Achaemenid ruler Cambyses (c. 530 BC). By some accounts Cambyses succeeded in occupying the area between the first and second Nile cataract, however Herodotus mentions that "his expedition failed miserably in the desert." Achaemenid inscriptions from both Egypt and Iran include Kush as part of the Achaemenid empire. For example, the DNa inscription of Darius I (r. 522–486 BC) on his tomb at Naqsh-e Rustam mentions Kūšīyā (Old Persian cuneiform: 𐎤𐎢𐏁𐎡𐎹𐎠, pronounced Kūshīyā) among the territories being "ruled over" by the Achaemenid Empire. Derek Welsby states "scholars have doubted that this Persian expedition ever took place, but... archaeological evidence suggests that the fortress of Dorginarti near the second cataract served as Persia's southern boundary."

From around 425–300 BC, beginning under the rule of king Amannote-erike, Kush saw a series of kings who revitalized older practices such as the erection of royal steles or royal statues. It was likely also in this period when several older pyramids, among them that of Taharqo, were enlarged. The stele of king Harsiotef, who from around 400 BC ruled for at least 35 years, reports how he fought a multitude of campaigns against enemies ranging from Meroe in the south to Lower Nubia in the north while also donating to temples throughout Kush. King Nastasen (c. 325) waged several wars against nomad groups and again in Lower Nubia. Nastasen was the last king to be buried at Nuri. His successors built six pyramids at Jebel Barkal and two in the old necropolis of el-Kurru, although the lack of inscriptions prevents identifying their occupants. It seems likely that this was a time of unrest and conflict within the royal elite.

=== Meroitic period (c. 270 BC – 4th century AD) ===
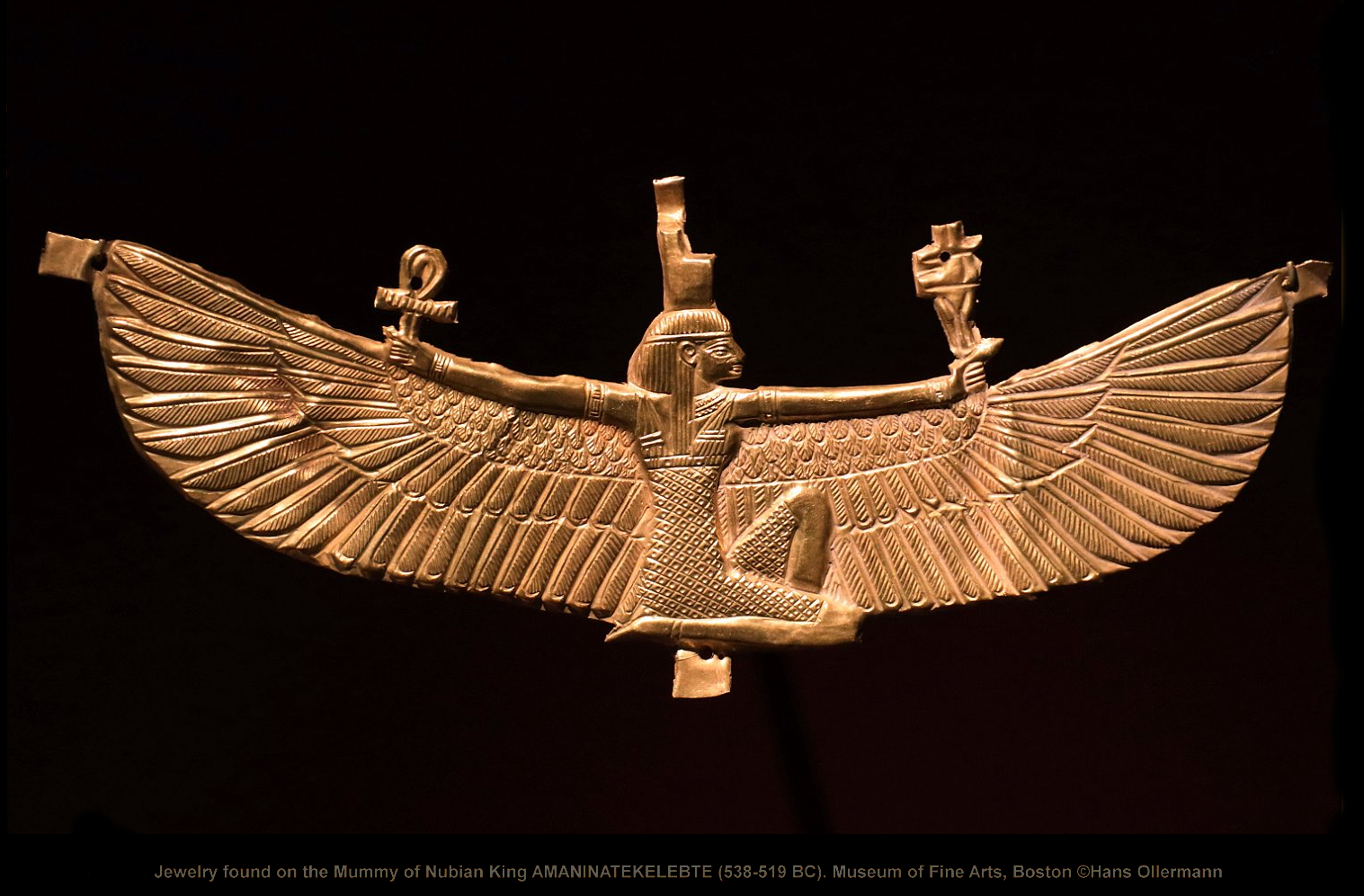
Jewelry found on the Mummy of Nubian King Amaninatakilebte (538–519 BC), Nuri pyramid 10. Museum of Fine Arts, Boston

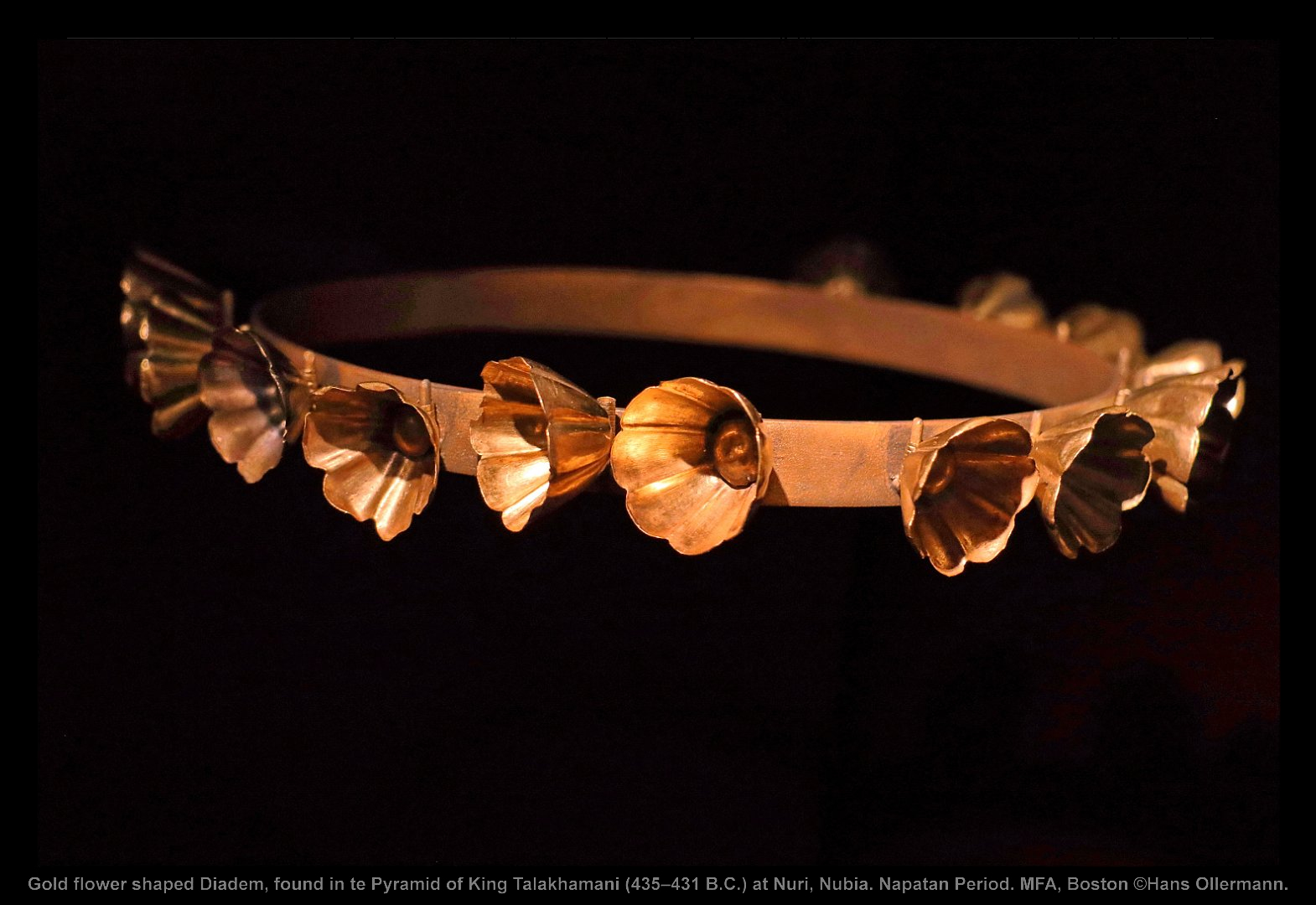
Gold flower shaped diadem, found in the Pyramid of King Talakhamani (435–431 BC), Nuri pyramid 16. Museum of Fine Arts, Boston.

Aspelta moved the capital to Meroë, considerably farther south than Napata, possibly c. 591 BC, just after the sack of Napata by Psamtik II. Martin Meredith states the Kushite rulers chose Meroë, between the Fifth and Sixth Cataracts, because it was on the fringe of the summer rainfall belt, and the area was rich in iron ore and hardwood for iron working. The location also afforded access to trade routes to the Red Sea. The Kush traded iron products with the Romans, in addition to gold, ivory and slaves. The Butana plain was stripped of its forests, leaving behind slag piles.

In about 300 BC, the move to Meroë was made more complete when the monarchs began to be buried there, instead of at Napata. One theory is that this represents the monarchs breaking away from the power of the priests at Napata. According to Diodorus Siculus, Kushite king Ergamenes defied the priests and had them slaughtered. This story may refer to the first ruler to be buried at Meroë with a similar name such as Arqamani, who ruled many years after the royal cemetery was opened at Meroë. During this same period, the Kushite authority may have extended some 1,500 km along the Nile River valley from the Egyptian frontier in the north to areas far south of modern Khartoum and probably also substantial territories to the east and west.

==== Relations with Ptolemaic Egypt ====
There is some record of conflict between the Kushites and Ptolemaic Egypt. In 275 or 274 BC, Ptolemy II (r. 283–246 BC) sent an army to Nubia, and defeated the Kingdom of Kush, annexing to Egypt the area later known as Triakontaschoinos. In addition, there was a serious revolt at the end of the reign of Ptolemy IV, around 204 BC, and the Kushites likely tried to interfere in Ptolemaic affairs. It has been suggested that this led to Ptolemy V defacing the name of Arqamani on inscriptions at Philae. "Arqamani constructed a small entrance hall to the temple built by Ptolemy IV at selchis and constructed a temple at Philae to which Ptolemy contributed an entrance hall." There is evidence of Ptolemaic occupation as far south as the second cataract, but recent finds at Qasr Ibrim, such as "the total absence of Ptolemaic pottery" have cast doubts on the effectiveness of the occupation. Dynastic struggles led to the Ptolemies abandoning the area, so "the Kushites reasserted their control...with Qasr Ibrim occupied" (by the Kushites) and other locations perhaps garrisoned.

==== Relations with the Roman Empire ====
According to Welsby, after the Romans assumed control of Egypt, they negotiated with the Kushites at Philae and drew the southern border of Roman Egypt at Aswan. Theodor Mommsen and Welsby state the Kingdom of Kush became a client Kingdom, which was similar to the situation under Ptolemaic rule of Egypt. Kushite ambition and excessive Roman taxation are two theories for a revolt that was supported by Kushite armies. The ancient historians, Strabo and Pliny, give accounts of the conflict with Roman Egypt.

Strabo describes a war with the Romans in the first century BC. According to Strabo, the Kushites "sacked Aswan with an army of 30,000 men and destroyed imperial statues...at Philae." A "fine over-life-size bronze head of the emperor Augustus" was found buried in Meroe in front of a temple. After the initial victories of Kandake (or "Candace") Amanirenas against Roman Egypt, the Kushites were defeated and Napata sacked. The destruction of the capital of Napata was not a crippling blow to the Kushites and did not prevent Candace from again engaging in combat with the Roman military. In 22 BC, a large Kushite force moved northward with intention of attacking Qasr Ibrim. Alerted to the advance, Gaius Petronius, prefect of Roman Egypt, again marched south and managed to reach Qasr Ibrim and bolster its defenses before the invading Kushites arrived. Welsby states after a Kushite attack on Primis (Qasr Ibrim), the Kushites sent ambassadors to negotiate a peace settlement with Petronius. The Kushites succeeded in negotiating a peace treaty on favorable terms. Trade between the two nations increased and the Roman Egyptian border was extended to "Hiera Sykaminos (Maharraqa)." This arrangement "guaranteed peace for most of the next 300 years" and there is "no definite evidence of further clashes."

It is possible that the Roman emperor Nero planned another attempt to conquer Kush before his death in AD 68. Nero sent two centurions upriver as far as Bahr el Ghazal River in 66 AD in an attempt to discover the source of the Nile, per Seneca, or plan an attack, per Pliny.

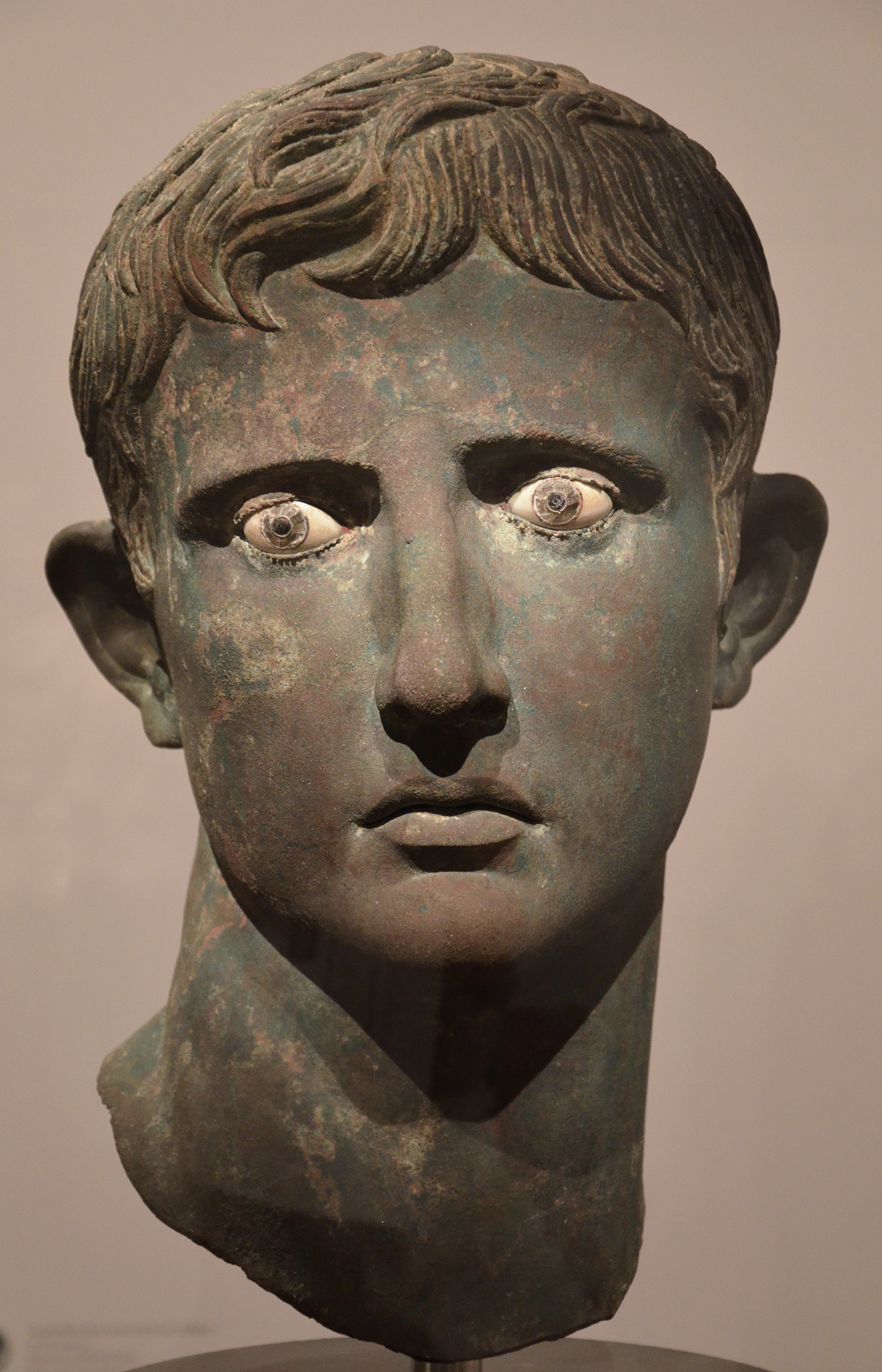
The bronze Meroë Head of Emperor Augustus found under the staircase of a temple in Meroe

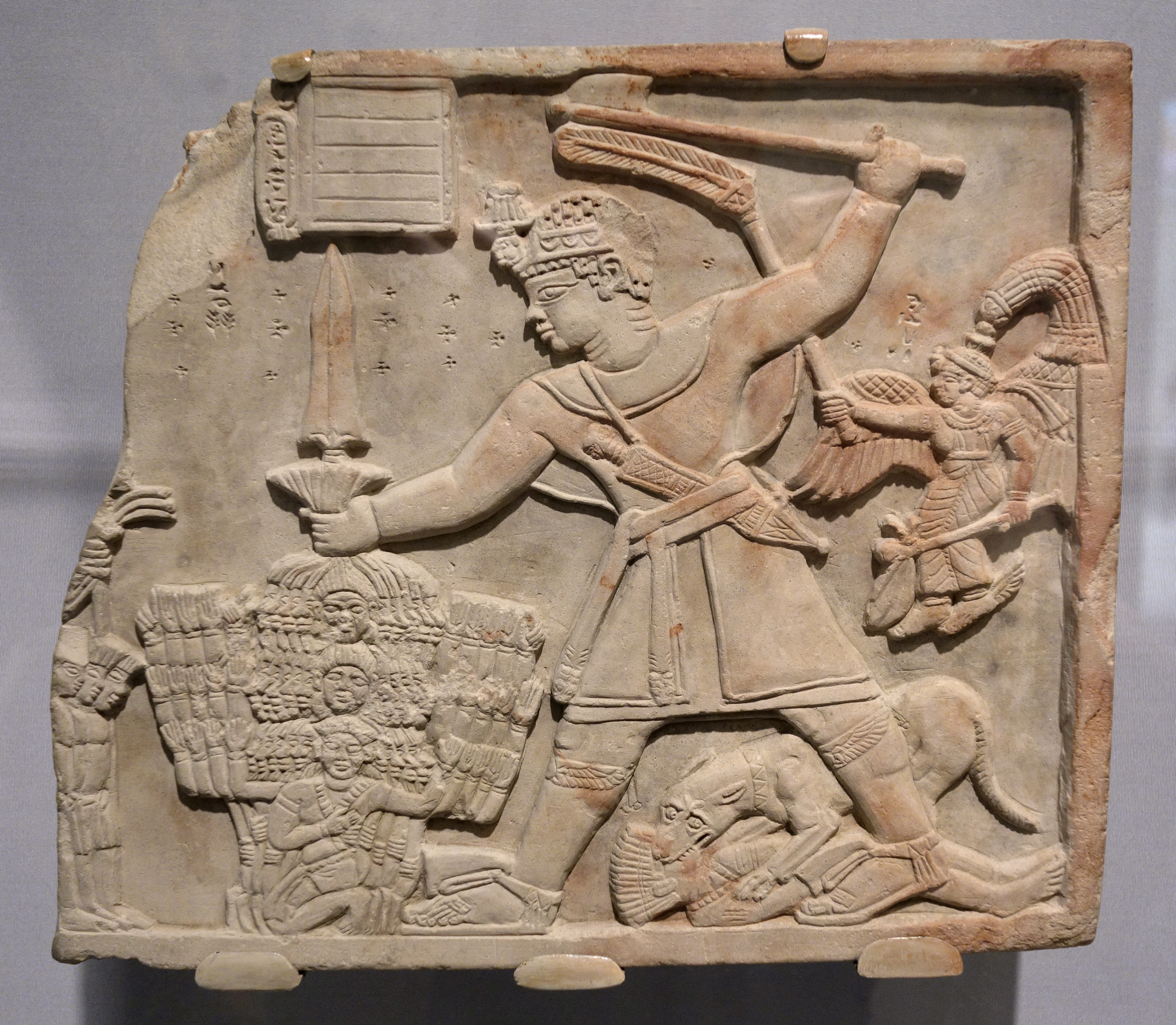
Meroitic prince Arikhankharer smiting his enemies, first century AD (Worcester Art Museum, Worcester, MA)

==== Decline and fall ====
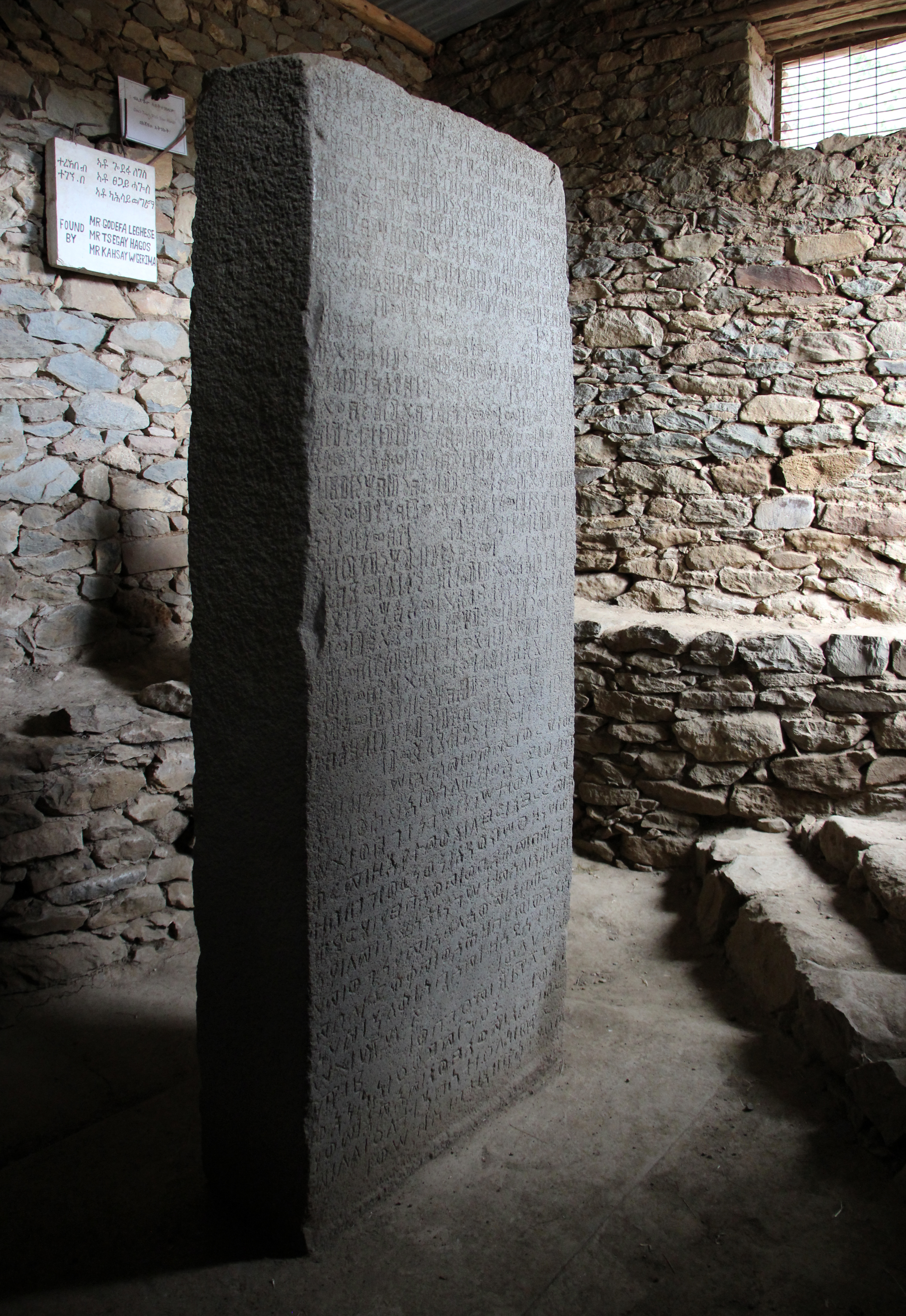
The stele of Aksumite Emperor Ezana commemorating his expedition against the Noba and Kush

Kush began to fade as a power by the first or second century AD, sapped by the war with the Roman province of Egypt and the decline of its traditional industries. However, there is evidence of third century AD Kushite Kings at Philae in demotic and inscription. It has been suggested that the Kushites reoccupied lower Nubia after Roman forces were withdrawn to Aswan. Kushite activities led others to note "a de facto Kushite control of that area (as far north as Philae) for part of the third century AD. Thereafter, it weakened and disintegrated due to internal rebellion.

The fall of Meroe is often associated with an Aksumite invasion. An Aksumite presence in Meroe is confirmed by two fragmentary Greek inscriptions. The better preserved one referred to military actions and the imposition of a tribute. They probably belonged to Aksumite victory monuments and were dedicated to Ares/Maher, the god of war. Thus, they must have been erected before Aksum's conversion to Christianity in around 340, perhaps by king Ousanas (r. c. 310–330). An inscription from Aksum mentioning Kush as vassal kingdom may also be attributed to Ousanas. The trilingual stele of his successor Ezana describes another expedition which happened after 340. Ezana's army followed the course of the Atbara until reaching the Nile confluence, where he waged war against Kush. Meroe itself is not mentioned, suggesting that Ezana did not attack the town. Aksum's presence in Nubia was likely short-lived.

Meroitic texts from as early as the 1st century BC hint to conflicts with the Noba, who lived west of the Nile and were governed by their own chiefs and kings. Perhaps it was the increasingly arid climate that forced them to attack the Nile Valley, although they would not manage to break through until the 4th century. The Ezana stele mentioned that they had occupied Kushite towns and were active as far east as the Takeze River, where they harassed Aksumite vassals. These attacks and them breaking oaths they had sworn to Ezana were the main reason for his Nubian expedition. It has been proposed that the Noba were not necessarily Nubian-speakers, but that the term "Noba" was rather a pejorative Meroitic word applied to a large variety of people living outside the Meroitic state. A Meroitic stele found at Gebel Adda from around 300 AD, however, seems to mention a king bearing the Nubian name Trotihi. A bowl from a 4th-century elite burial in el-Hobagi features a Meroitic-Nubian inscription mentioning a "king", but identifying the interred individual and the polity he ruled over remains problematic.

At Meroe, the last pyramids as well as non-royal burials are dated to the mid-4th century, which is conventionally thought to be when the kingdom of Kush came to an end. Afterwards began the so-called "post-Meroitic" period. This period saw a decline of urbanism, the disappearance of the Meroitic religion and script as well as the emergence of regional elites buried in large tumuli. Princely burials from Qustul (c. 380–410) and Ballana (410–500) in Lower Nubia are connected to the rise of Nobatia. To its north were the Blemmyes, who in around 394 established a kingdom centered around Talmis that lasted until it was conquered by Nobatia in around 450. The political developments south of the third cataract remain obscure, but it appears that Dongola, the later capital of Makuria as well as Soba, the capital of Alodia, were founded in that period. Nobatia, Makuria and Alodia eventually converted to Christianity in the 6th century, marking the beginning of medieval Nubia.

== Language and writing ==
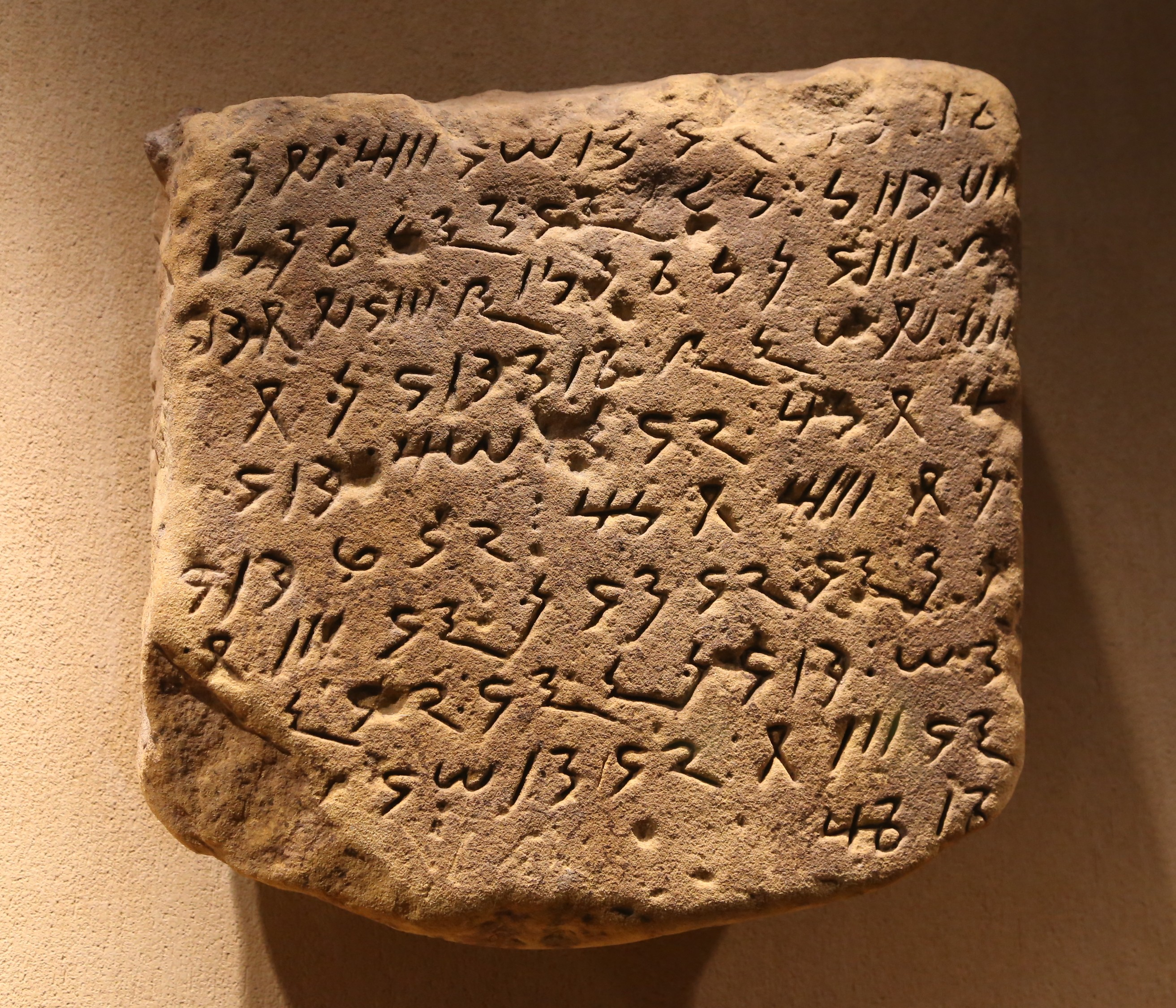
Meroitic ostracon

The Meroitic language was spoken in Meroë and Sudan during the Meroitic period (attested from 300 BC). It became extinct around 400 AD. It is uncertain to which language family the Meroitic language belongs. Kirsty Rowan suggests that Meroitic, like the Egyptian language, belongs to the Afro-Asiatic family. She bases this on its sound inventory and phonotactics, which she argues are similar to those of the Afro-Asiatic languages and dissimilar from those of the Nilo-Saharan languages. Claude Rilly proposes that Meroitic, like the Nobiin language, belongs to the Eastern Sudanic branch of the Nilo-Saharan family, based in part on its syntax, morphology, and known vocabulary.

In the Napatan Period Egyptian hieroglyphs were used: at this time writing seems to have been restricted to the court and temples. From the second century BC, there was a separate Meroitic writing system. The language was written in two forms of the Meroitic alphabet: Meroitic Cursive, which was written with a stylus and was used for general record-keeping; and Meroitic Hieroglyphic, which was carved in stone or used for royal or religious documents. It is not well understood due to the scarcity of bilingual texts. The earliest inscription in Meroitic writing dates from between 180 and 170 BC. These hieroglyphics were found engraved on the temple of Queen Shanakdakhete. Meroitic Cursive is written horizontally, and reads from right to left. This was an alphabetic script with 23 signs used in a hieroglyphic form (mainly on monumental art) and in a cursive form. The latter was widely used; so far some 1,278 texts using this version are known (Leclant 2000). The script was deciphered by Griffith, but the language behind it is still a problem, with only a few words understood by modern scholars. It is not as yet possible to connect the Meroitic language with other known languages. For a time, it was also possibly used to write the Old Nubian language of the successor Nubian kingdoms.

== Technology, medicine, and mathematics ==
=== Technology ===
The natives of the Kingdom of Kush developed a type of water wheel or scoop wheel, the saqiyah, named kolē by the Kush. The saqiyah was developed during the Meroitic period to improve irrigation. The introduction of this machine had a decisive influence on agriculture especially in Dongola as this wheel lifted water 3 to 8 meters with much less expenditure of labor and time than the shaduf, which was the previous chief irrigation device in the kingdom. The shaduf relied on human energy but the saqiyah was driven by buffalos or other animals. The people of Kerma, ancestors to the Kushites, built bronze kilns through which they manufactured objects of daily use such as razors, mirrors and tweezers.

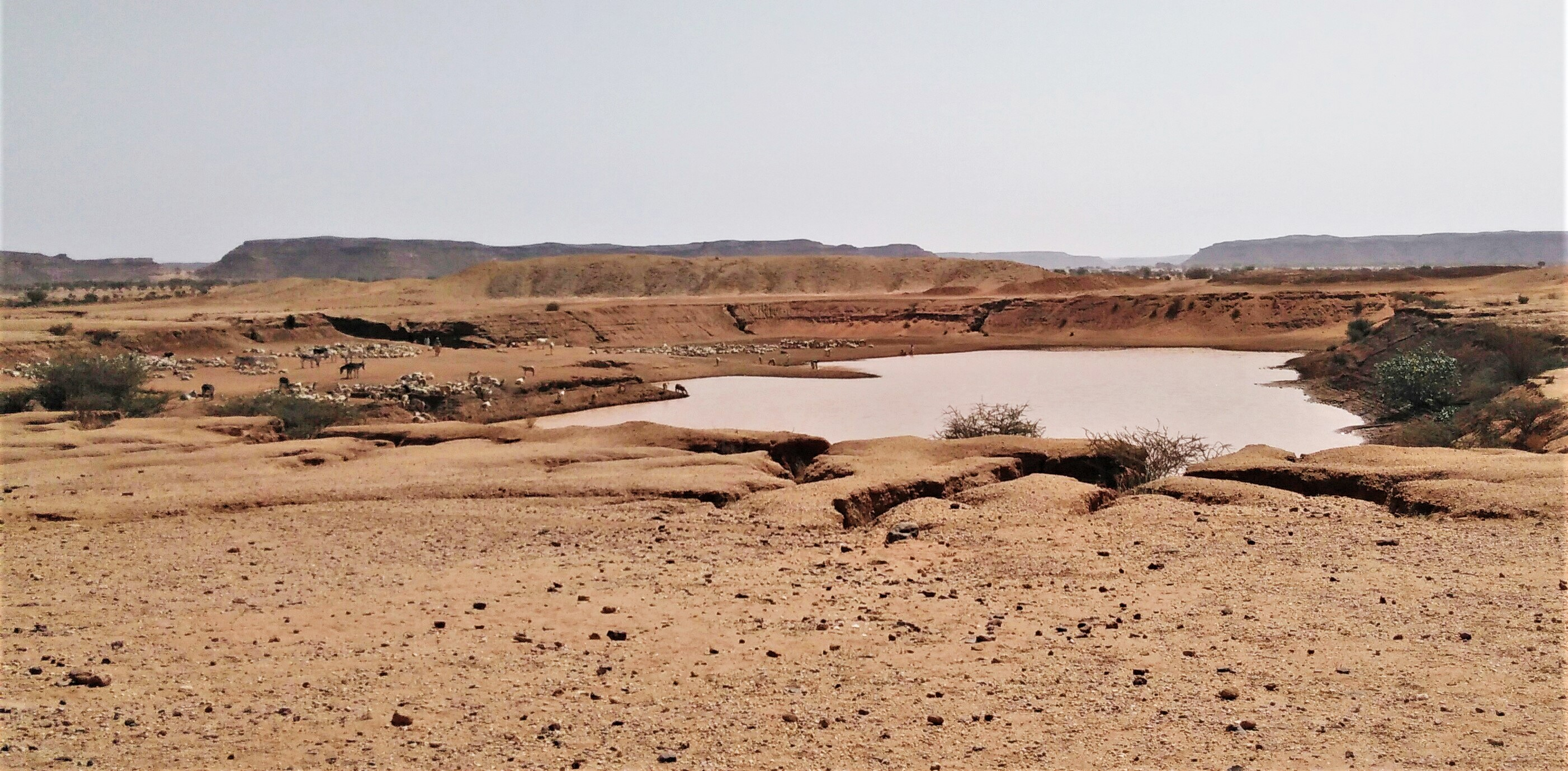
The "Great Hafir" (reservoir) at Musawwarat es-Sufra

The Kushites developed a form of reservoir, known as a hafir, during the Meroitic period. Eight hundred ancient and modern hafirs have been registered in the Meroitic town of Butana. The functions of hafirs were to catch water during the rainy season for storage, to ensure water is available for several months during the dry season as well as supply drinking water, irrigate fields, and water cattle. The Great Hafir, or Great Reservoir, near the Lion Temple in Musawwarat es-Sufra is a notable hafir built by the Kushites. It was built to retain the rainfall of the short, wet season. It is 250 m in diameter and 6.3 m deep.

Bloomeries and blast furnaces could have been used in metalworking at Meroë. Early records of bloomery furnaces dated at least to seventh and sixth century BC have been discovered in Kush. The ancient bloomeries that produced metal tools for the Kushites produced a surplus for sale.

=== Medicine ===
Nubian mummies studied in the 1990s revealed that Kush was a pioneer of early antibiotics.

Tetracycline was being used by Nubians, based on bone remains between 350 AD and 550 AD. The antibiotic was in wide commercial use only in the mid 20th century. The theory states that earthen jars containing grain used for making beer contained the bacterium streptomyces, which produced tetracycline. Although Nubians were not aware of tetracycline, they could have noticed that people fared better by drinking beer than just consuming the grain itself. According to Charlie Bamforth, a professor of biochemistry and brewing science at the University of California, Davis, "They must have consumed it because it was rather tastier than the grain from which it was derived."

=== Mathematics ===
Based on engraved plans of Meroitic King Amanikhabali's pyramids, Nubians had a sophisticated understanding of mathematics as they appreciated the harmonic ratio. The engraved plans are indicative of much to be revealed about Nubian mathematics. The ancient Nubians also established a system of geometry which they used in creating early versions of sun clocks. During the Meroitic period in Nubian history, the Nubians used a trigonometric methodology similar to the Egyptians.

== Military ==
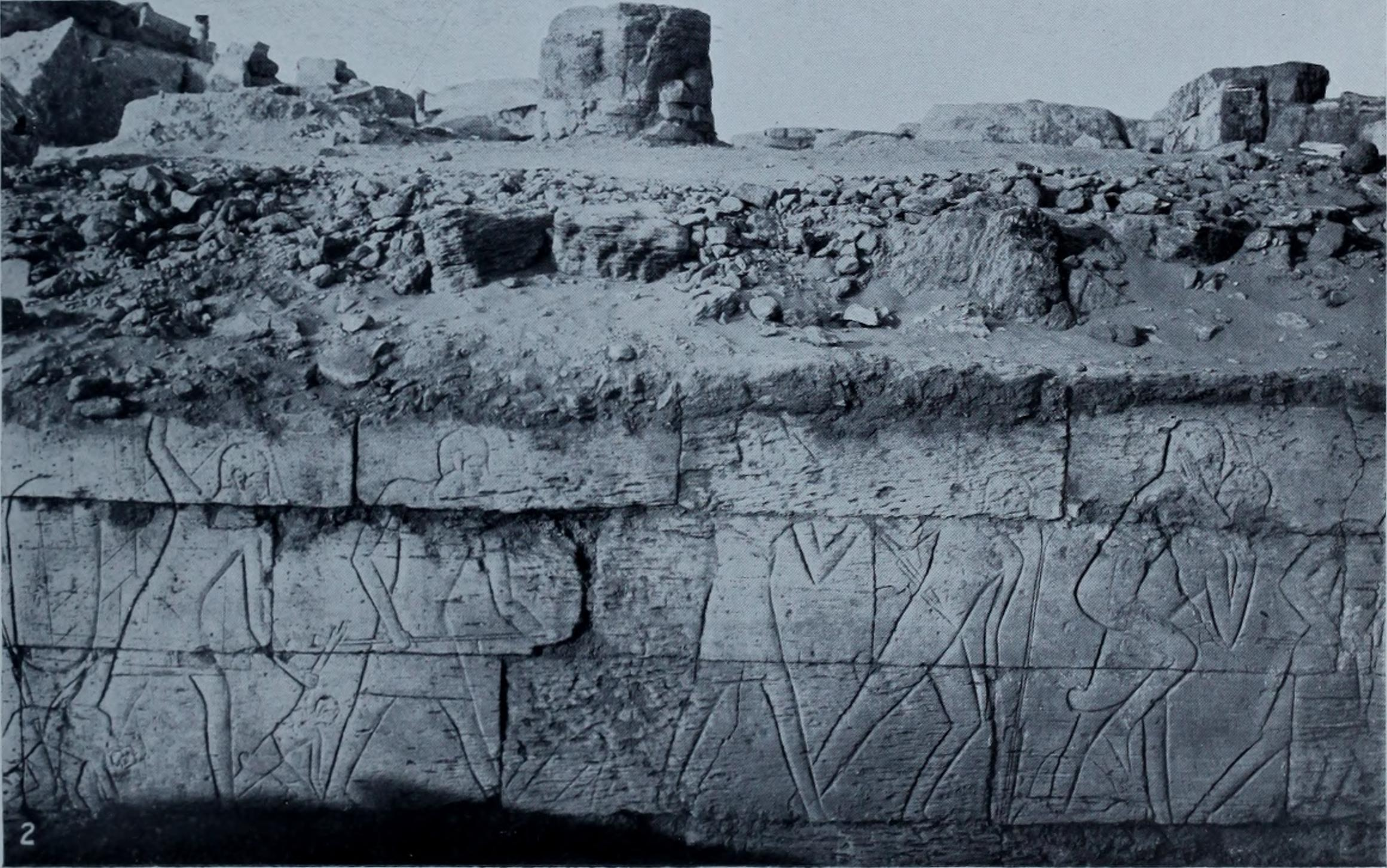
Relief of a battle scene on temple Meroe 250 (also known as "Sun Temple"), 1st century AD

During the siege of Hermopolis in the eighth century BC, siege towers were built for the Kushite army led by Piye, in order to enhance the efficiency of Kushite archers and slingers. After leaving Thebes, Piye's first objective was besieging Ashmunein. Following his army's lack of success he undertook the personal supervision of operations including the erection of a siege tower from which Kushite archers could fire down into the city. Early shelters protecting sappers armed with poles trying to breach mud-brick ramparts gave way to battering rams.

Bowmen were the most important force components in the Kushite military. Ancient sources indicate that Kushite archers favored one-piece bows that were between six and seven feet long, with a draw strength so powerful that many of the archers used their feet to bend their bows. However, composite bows were also used in their arsenal. Greek historian Herodotus indicated that primary bow construction was of seasoned palm wood, with arrows made of cane. Kushite arrows were often poisoned-tipped.

Elephants were occasionally used in warfare during the Meroitic period, as seen in the war against Rome around 20 BC.

== Architecture ==
During the Bronze Age, Nubian ancestors of the Kingdom of Kush built speoi (a speos is a temple or tomb cut into a rock face) between 3700 and 3250 BC. This greatly influenced the architecture of the New Kingdom of Egypt. Tomb monuments were one of the more recognizable expressions of Kushite architecture. Uniquely Kushite tomb monuments were found from the beginning of the empire, at el Kurru, to the decline of the kingdom. These monuments developed organically from Middle Nile (e.g. A-group) burial types. Tombs became progressively larger during the 25th dynasty, culminating in Taharqa's underground rectangular building with "aisles of square piers...the whole being cut from the living rock." Kushites also created pyramids, mud-brick temples (deffufa), and masonry temples. Kushites borrowed much from Egypt, as it relates to temple design. Kushite temples were quite diverse in their plans, except for the Amun temples which all have the same basic plan. The Jebel Barkal and Meroe Amun temples are exceptions with the 150 m long Jebel Barkal being "by far the largest 'Egyptian' temple ever built in Nubia." Temples for major Egyptian deities were built on "a system of internal harmonic proportions" based on "one or more rectangles each with sides in the ratio of 8:5" Kush also invented Nubian vaults.

Piye is thought to have constructed the first true pyramid at el Kurru. Pyramids are "the archetypal tomb monument of the Kushite royal family" and found at "el Kurru, Nuri, Jebel Barkal, and Meroe." The Kushite pyramids are smaller with steeper sides than northern Egyptian pyramids. The Kushites are thought to have copied the pyramids of New Kingdom elites, as opposed to Old and Middle Kingdom pharaohs. Kushite housing consisted mostly of circular timber huts with some apartment houses with several two-room apartments. The apartment houses likely accommodated extended families.

The Kushites built a stone-paved road at Jebel Barkal, are thought to have built piers/harbors on the Nile river, and many wells.

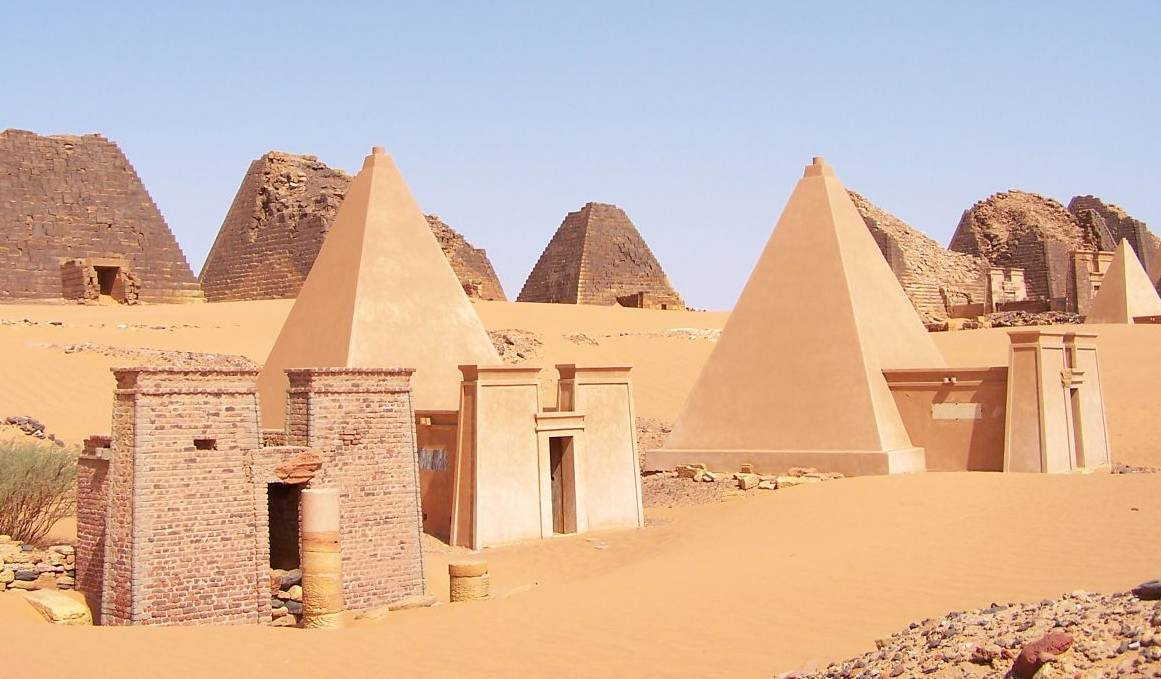
The pyramids of Meroe – UNESCO World Heritage

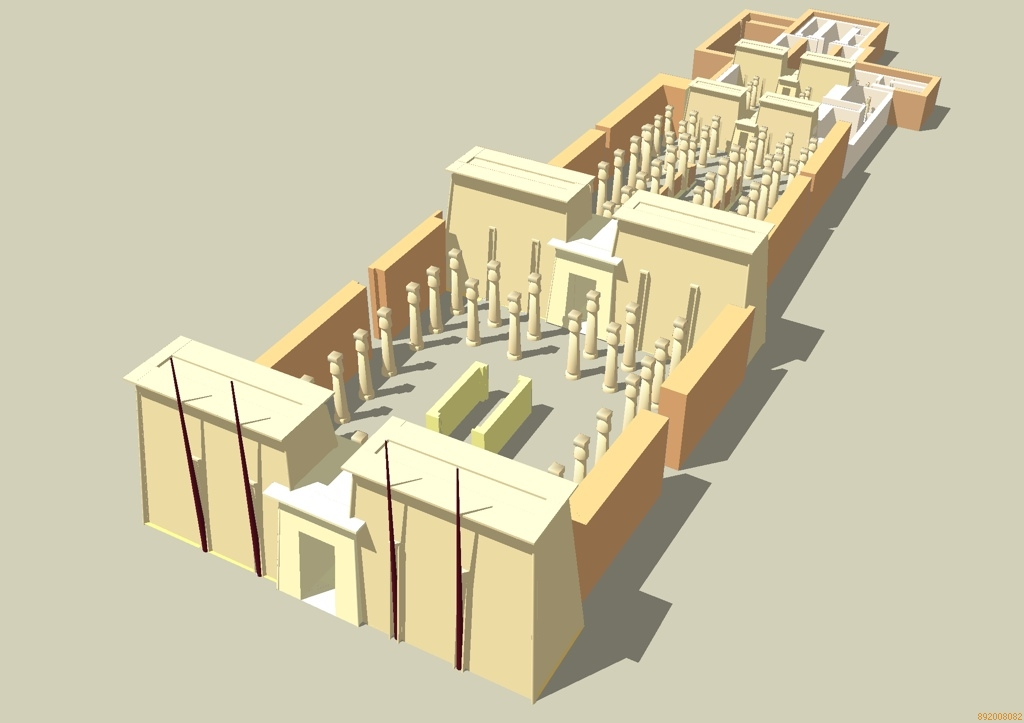
Amun temple of Jebel Barkal, originally built during the Egyptian New Kingdom but greatly enhanced by Piye

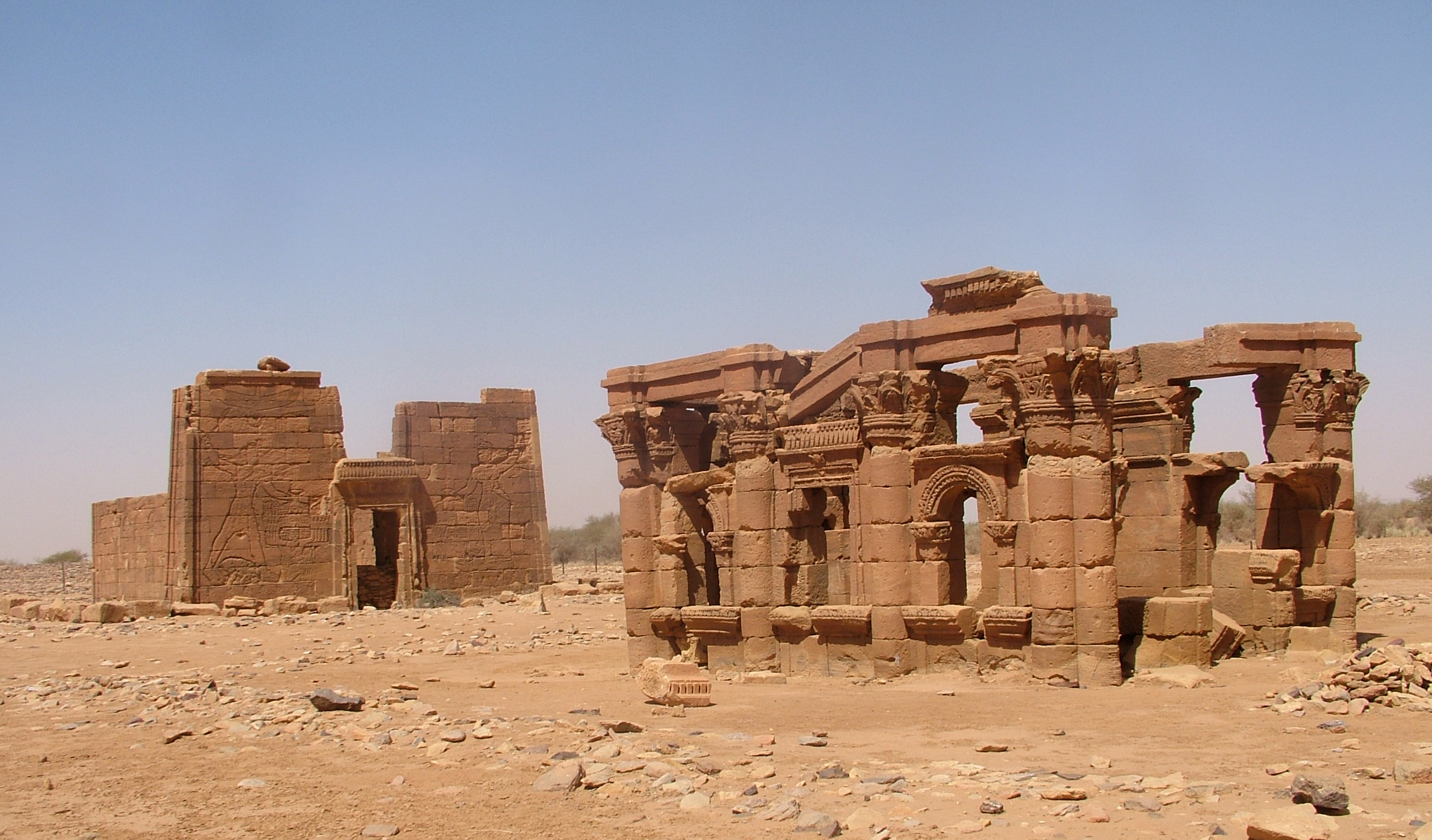
The so-called "Roman kiosk" (right) and temple of Apedemak (left), Naqa (1st century AD)

== Economy ==
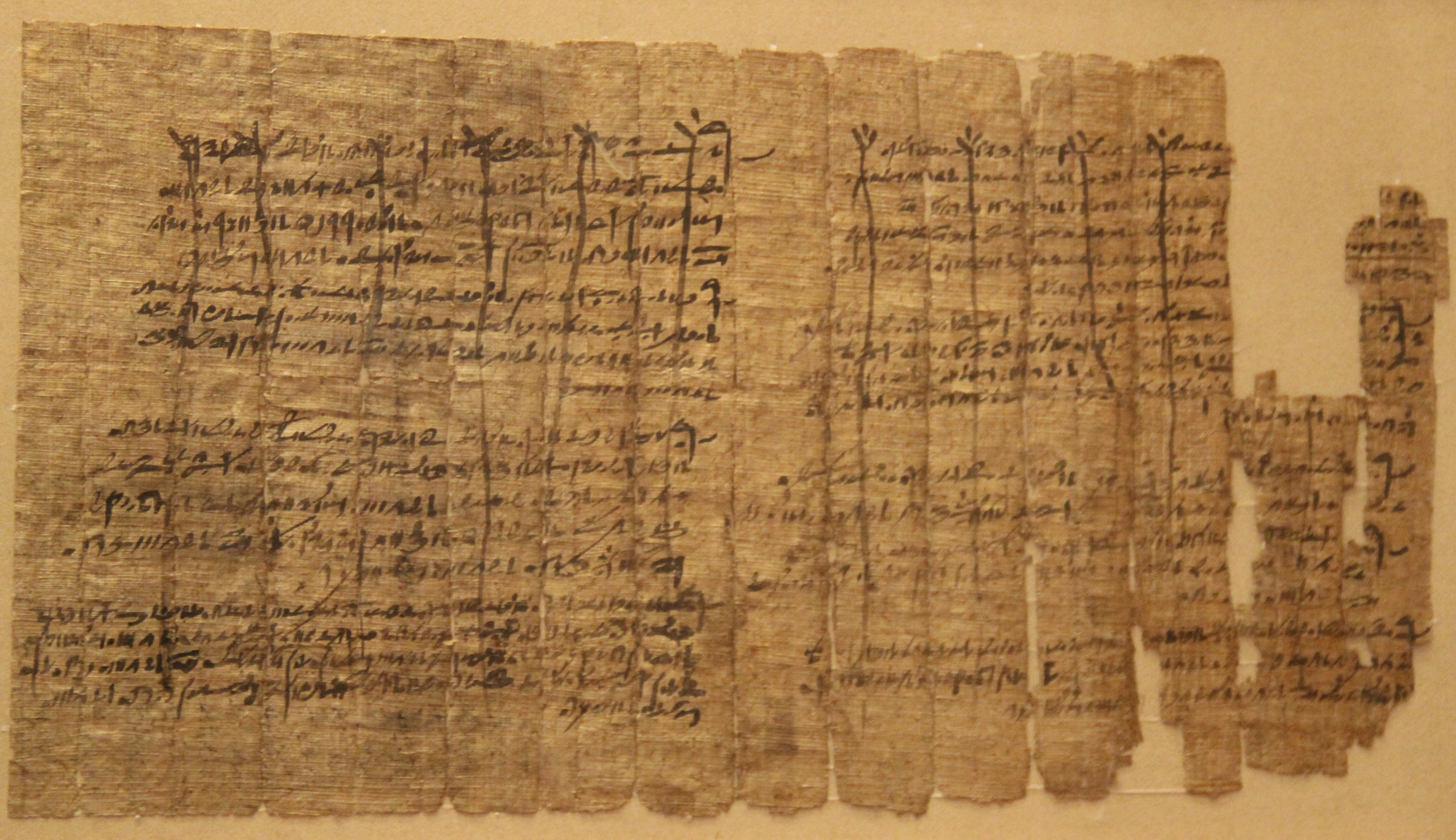
Hieratic papyrus written during the reigns of Taharqa and Shabaqa discussing financial matters, Thebes

Some scholars believe the economy in the Kingdom of Kush was a redistributive system. The state would collect taxes in the form of surplus produce and would redistribute it to the people. Others believe that most of the society worked on the land and required nothing from the state and did not contribute to the state. Northern Kush seems to have been more productive and wealthier than the Southern area.

== Kush and Egyptology ==
On account of the Kingdom of Kush's proximity to Ancient Egypt – the first cataract at Elephantine usually being considered the traditional border between the two polities – and because the 25th dynasty ruled over both states in the eighth century BC, from the Rift Valley to the Taurus mountains, historians have closely associated the study of Kush with Egyptology, in keeping with the general assumption that the complex sociopolitical development of Egypt's neighbors can be understood in terms of Egyptian models. As a result, the political structure and organization of Kush as an independent ancient state has not received as thorough attention from scholars, and there remains much ambiguity especially surrounding the earliest periods of the state. Edwards has suggested that the study of the region could benefit from increased recognition of Kush as a state in its own right, with distinct cultural conditions, rather than merely as a secondary state on the periphery of Egypt.

== Gallery ==
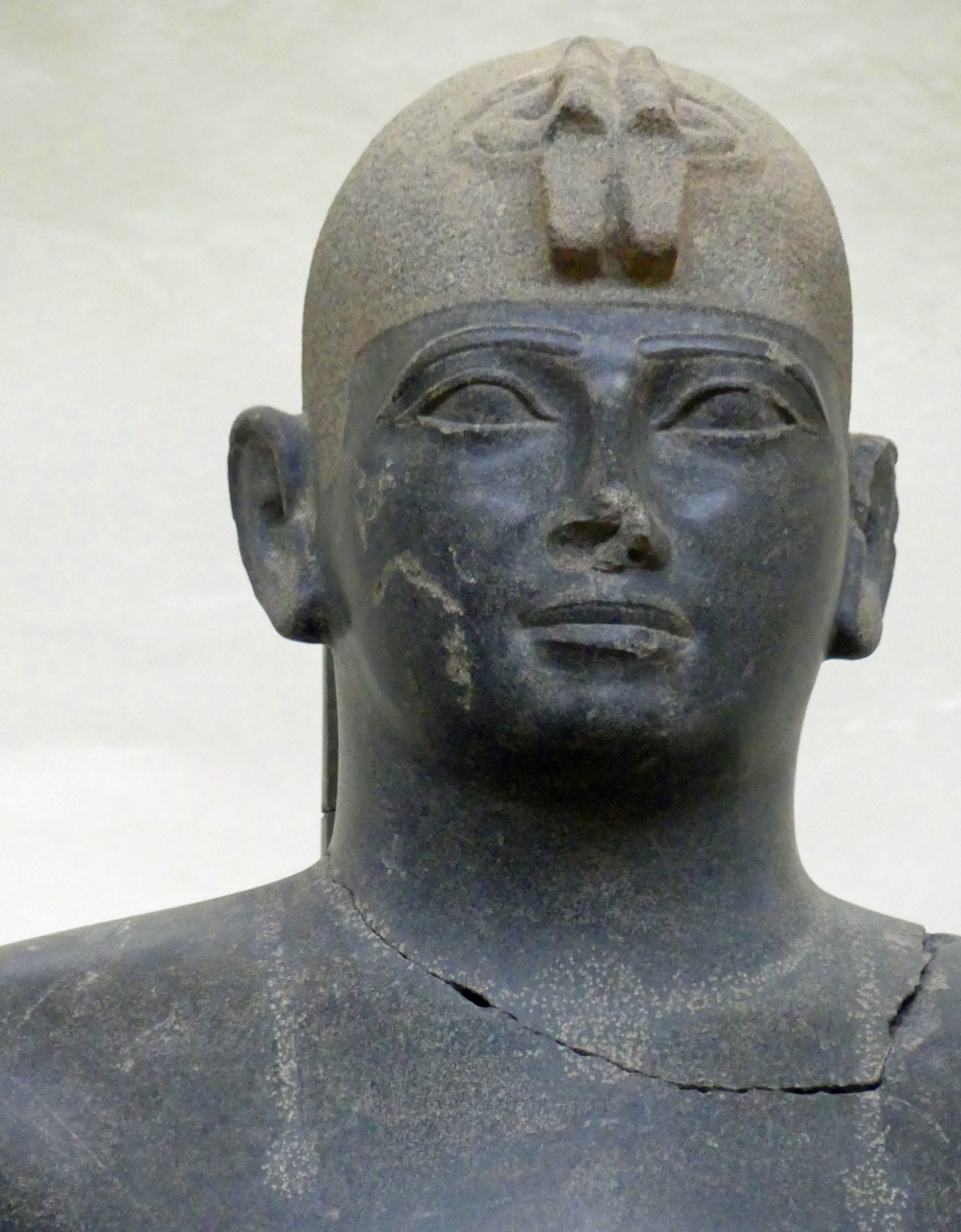
Portrait of Taharqa, Kerma Museum

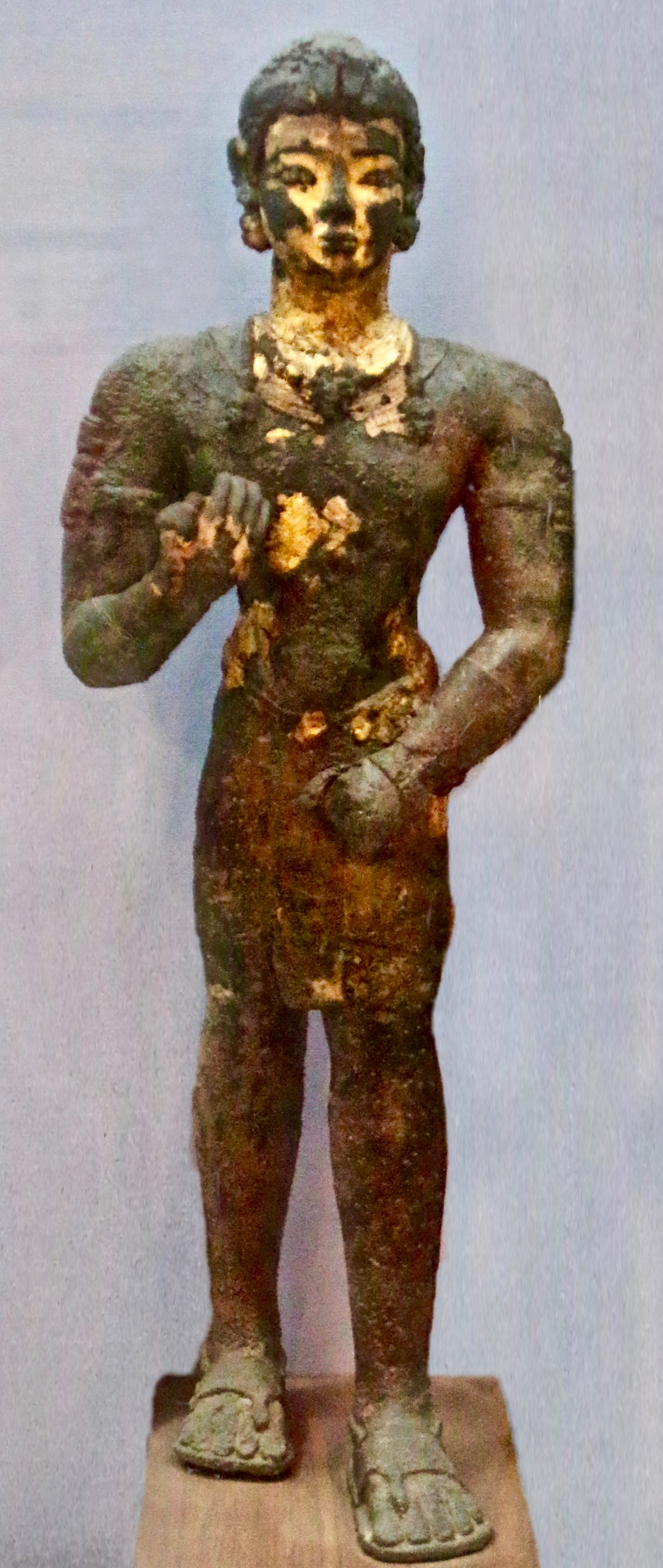
The "Archer King", an unknown king of Meroe, 3rd century BC. National Museum of Sudan.

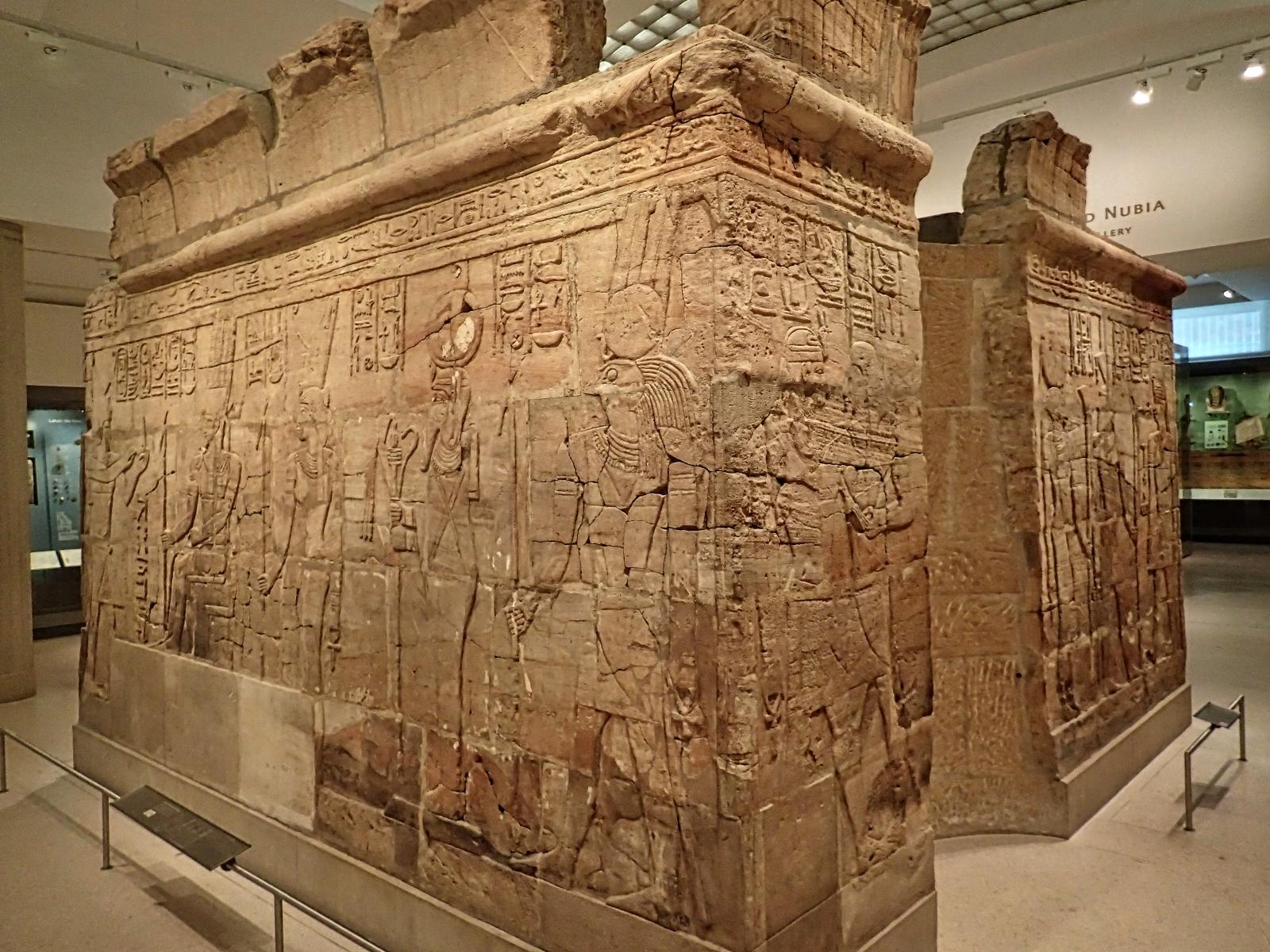
Taharqa's shrine, Ashmolean museum in Oxford, UK

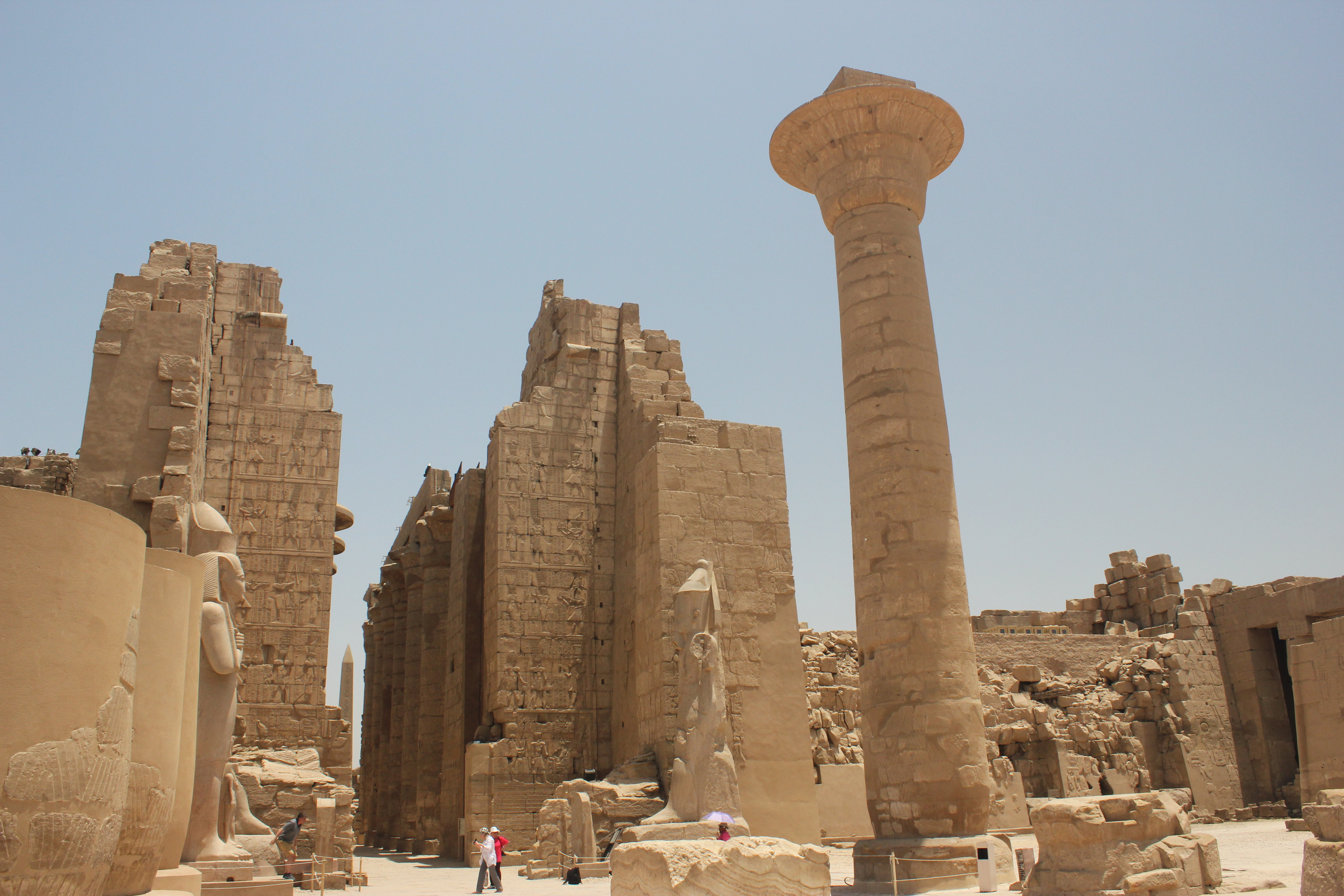
Taharqa's kiosk, Karnak Temple

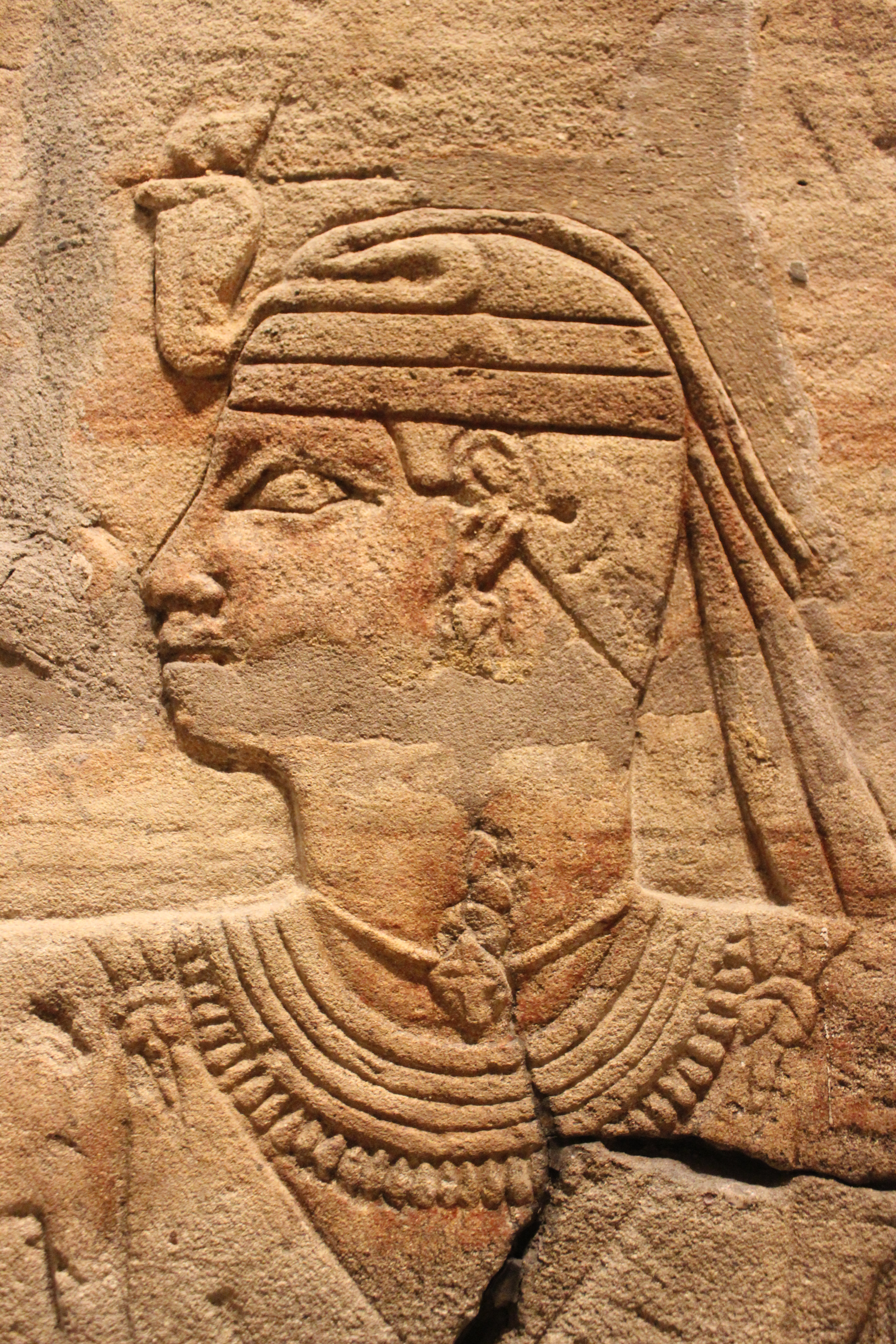
Pharaoh Taharqa of Ancient Egypt's 25th Dynasty. Ashmolean Museum, Oxford UK

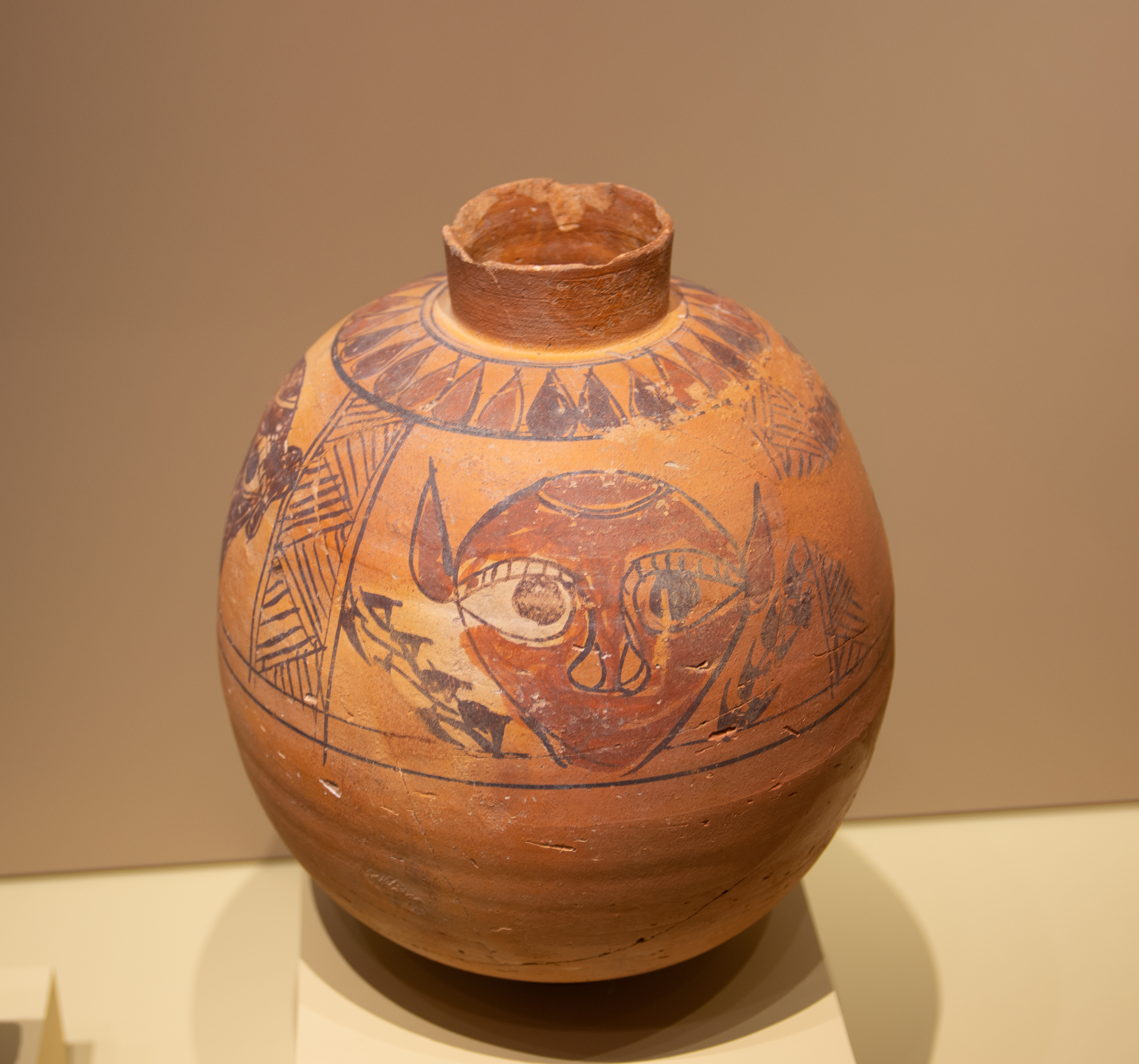
Meroitic pottery, Nelluah (Egyptian Nubia)

== See also ==
- Aethiopia is an ancient Greek geographical term which referred to the regions of Sudan and areas south of the Sahara desert.
- List of monarchs of Kush
- Merowe Dam
- Nubiology
- Twenty-fifth Dynasty of Egypt family tree
