= Twenty-fifth Dynasty of Egypt family tree =

Family tree of ancient Egyptian rulers

The family tree of the 25th Dynasty is too complex to show in its entirety and it is not always clear whether a pharaoh is a son or brother of his predecessor. The following is a simplified – yet updated to 2017 – version following the new dynastic arrangement which sees Shebitku as Shabaka's predecessor rather than successor as traditionally stated.

denotes a Pharaoh of Ancient Egypt and King of Kush.
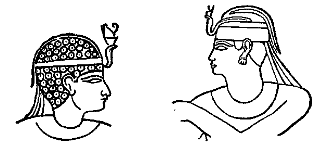
denotes a King of Kush.

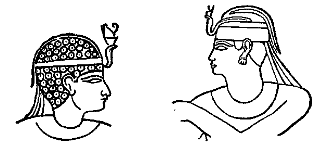
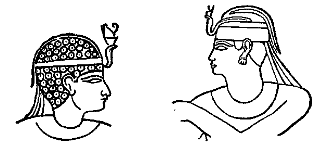
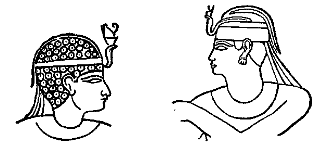
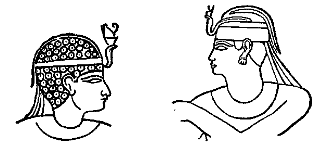
Pebatjma	Kashta	?	Alara
Amenirdis I	Peksater	Piye	Abar
Shebitku	Arty	Shepenupet II	Tabakenamun	Taharqa
Masabat	Shabaka	Qalhata	Atlanersa	Amenirdis II
Haremakhet	Piankharty	Isetemkheb H	Tantamani	Kings of Kush
Horkhebit
