= PY =

PY, Py, py or P-Y may stand for:

== People ==
- Py Sörman (1897–1947), Swedish author
- Eugène Py, a French cinema pioneer of the Cinema of Argentina
- Jorge Py, a Brazilian footballer
- Olivier Py, a French stage director, actor and writer
- Delphine Py-Bilot, a French triathlete
- Piye, a Kushite king and founder of the Twenty-fifth dynasty of Egypt
- Pierre-Yves Gerbeau, French businessman

== Science and technology ==
- Python (programming language), which uses the filename extension '.py'
- .py, the country code top level domain (ccTLD) for Paraguay
- py (unit), a Korean unit of floorspace area
- petayear, Py, 10^{15} year
- Py (cipher), a stream cipher designed by Eli Biham and Jennifer Seberry
- p-y method, for assessing the load-bearing abilities of deep foundations
- Permalloy, a nickel-iron magnetic alloy
- Pyridine, a common monodentate ligand in coordination chemistry, abbreviated as 'py'

== Other uses ==
- Py, Pyrénées-Orientales, a commune of the Pyrénées-Orientales département in southwestern France
- Pack year, a measure of cigarette smoking
- Paraguay, ISO 3166-1 country code
- Puducherry, formerly Pondicherry, a union territory of India
- Pinyin, a system of romanization (phonetic notation and transliteration to Roman script) for Mandarin Chinese
- Portsmouth yardstick, used as a rating system in yacht racing and dinghy racing
- Surinam Airways (IATA airline designator PY)
- A US Navy hull classification symbol: Patrol yacht (PY)
- Southwest Papua (vehicle registration prefix PY)
