= Piy =

Piy can refer to:

- Piya language, spoken in Nigeria, by ISO 639 code
- Piypite, a rare mineral

== See also ==
- Piye, an ancient Egyptian pharaoh
- Piy Margal Street, Manila, Philippines; see List of eponymous streets in Metro Manila
- Pee (disambiguation)
- PI (disambiguation)
- PY (disambiguation)
