= Haremakhet =

High Priest of Amun

- High Priest of Amun
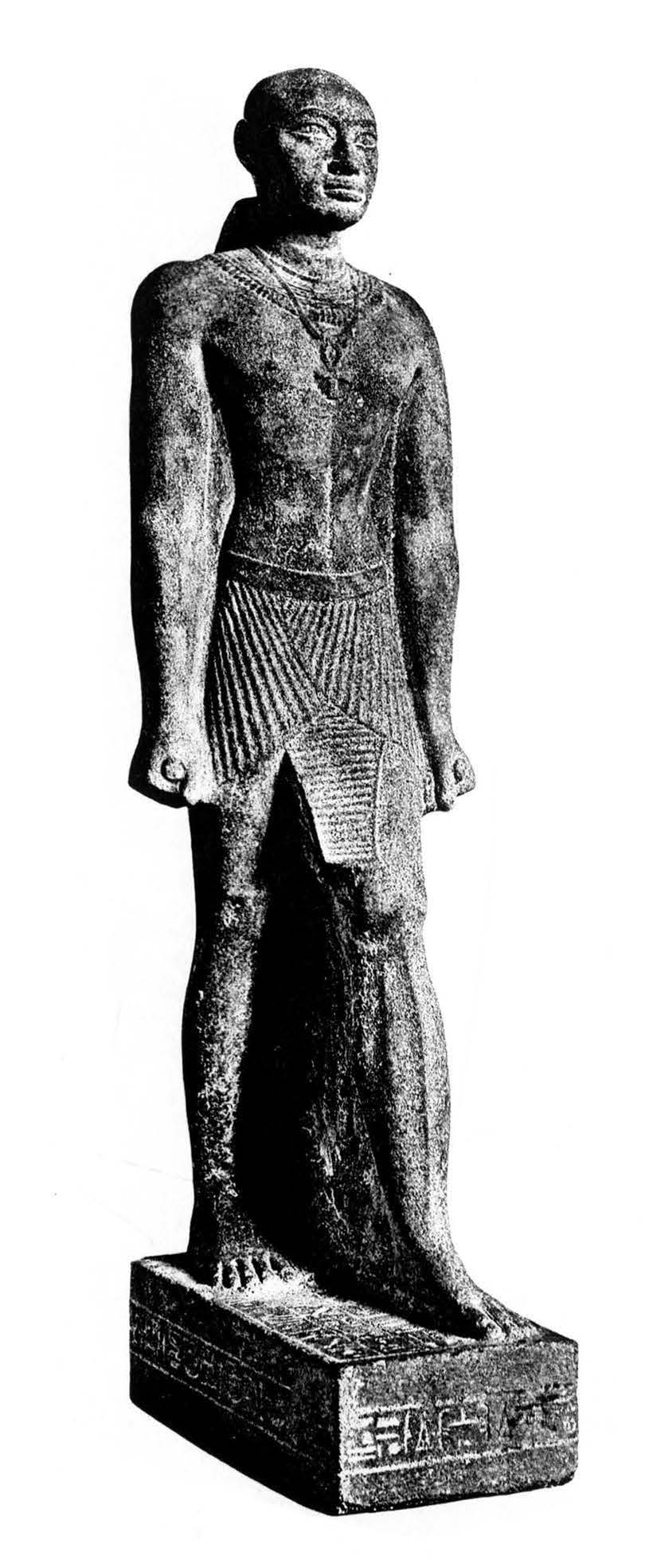
- Statue of Haremakhet (CG 42204)
- Successor: Harkhebi
- Dynasty: 25th Dynasty
- Pharaoh: Taharqa, Tanutamani
- Father: Shabaka
- Mother: Tabaktenamun?
- Children: Harkhebi

Haremakhet (also Horemakhet or, in Greek, Harmakhis) was an ancient Kushite prince and High Priest of Amun during the 25th Dynasty.

== Biography ==
A son of pharaoh Shabaka and possibly of his queen Tabaktenamun, he was appointed by his father as the High Priest of Amun in Thebes and he officiated during the reigns of Taharqa and Tanutamani. Haremakhet's immediate predecessors are unknown and it is possible that the charge of High Priest of Amun was vacant for decades. In any case, this once powerful and influential title had long lost its importance in favor of the God's Wife of Amun, a position which at the time of Haremakhet was held by Shepenupet II and then Amenirdis I.

Haremakhet is mainly known from a statue discovered in the Great Temple cachette at Karnak, formerly exhibited at the Cairo Egyptian Museum (CG 42204 / JE 38580) and now at the Nubian Museum of Aswan. On the statue, he is referred as

King’s son of Shabaka, justified, who loves him, Sole Confidant of king Taharqa, justified, Director of the palace of the king of Upper and Lower Egypt Tanutamani, may he live for ever.

Noticeably, in this inscription king Shebitku – who was commonly assumed to have ruled between Shabaka and Taharqa – is completely absent. Indeed, the inscription was among the seminal evidence supporting the 2010s chronological switch between the reigns of Shabaka and Shebitku, with Shebitku reigning first and Shabaka succeeding him.

After his death, Haremakhet was succeeded by his son Harkhebi, who is known to have been in charge as High Priest of Amun at the time of Nitocris I's adoption and later, thus during the reign of the founder of the 26th Dynasty, pharaoh Psamtik I.
