= Tabiry =

- Queen consort of Nubia and Egypt; Main King's Wife, The Great One of the Foreign Country, etc
- Burial: Pyramid Ku53 in Kuru, Nubia
- Spouse: Pharaoh Piye
- Issue: unknown
- Dynasty: 25th Dynasty of Egypt
- Father: Alara of Nubia
- Mother: Kasaqa

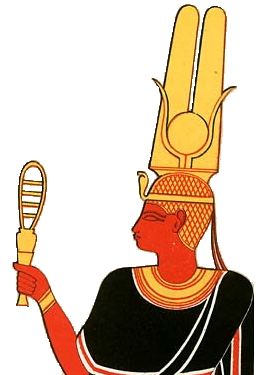
Nubian Queen from the Napatan period. Adapted from a scene depicting Queen Takhatamani.

Tabiry was a Nubian queen dated to the Twenty-fifth Dynasty of Egypt.

== Biography ==
t A b ir i i
Tabiry
in hieroglyphs
Era: New Kingdom
(1550–1069 BC)

Tabiry was the daughter of Alara of Nubia and his wife Kasaqa and the wife of King Piye. She held some interesting titles: Main King's Wife, first of her majesty (hmt niswt 'at tpit n hm.f) (the only other queen to hold the Main King's Wife title was Nefertiti) and “The Great One of the Foreign Country” (ta-aat-khesut). She also holds the more standard titles of King's Wife (hmt niswt), King's Daughter (s3t niswt), and King's Sister (snt niswt).

Tabiry was buried in a pyramid at El-Kurru (K.53). A carved granite funerary stela found in her tomb mentions she is the daughter of Alara of Nubia and the wife of Piye. The stela is now in Khartoum. The stela gives Tabiry further titles. Reisner had initially translated one of her titles as 'the great chieftainess of the Temehu' (southern Libyans), and concluded that the royal house of Kush was somehow related to the Libyans. Others have since shown that her title should be read as "Great One (or 'Chieftainess') of the Desert-dwellers", showing her title connects her to the Nubians.

A blue faience ushabti of Tabiry is now in the Petrie Museum in London (UC13220).
