= Alara of Kush =

Founder of the Napatan royal dynasty of Kush

Alara
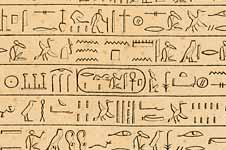
- The cartouche of Alara as it appears on the much later stele of Nastasen

Kushite King of Napata
- Reign: 8th century BC
- Successor: Kashta
Royal titulary
Nomen
Alara

| G39 N5 | i A1 E23 E23 i |
- Consort: Kasaqa
- Children: Queen Abar, Queen Tabiry

Alara was a King of Kush, who is generally regarded as the founder of the Napatan royal dynasty by his 25th Dynasty Kushite successors and was the first recorded prince of Kush. He unified all of Upper Nubia from Meroë to the Third Cataract and is possibly attested at the Temple of Amun at Kawa. Alara also established Napata as the religious capital of Kush. Alara himself was not a 25th dynasty Kushite king since he never controlled any region of Egypt during his reign compared to his two immediate successors: Kashta and Piye respectively. Nubian literature credits him with a substantial reign since future Nubian kings requested that they might enjoy a reign as long as Alara's. His memory was also central to the origin myth of the Kushite kingdom, which was embellished with new elements over time. Alara was a deeply revered figure in Nubian culture and the first Kushite king whose name came down to scholars.

== Alara in the historical records ==
Alara's existence is first documented in the Egyptian hieroglyphic stele of Queen Tabiry who was Alara's daughter by Queen Kasaqa, Alara's wife. Since Tabiry was the wife of Piye whereas Piye's direct predecessor on the throne of Kush was Kashta, Alara was most likely Kashta's predecessor in turn. While Alara was not assigned a royal title in Queen Tabiry's stele, his name was written in the form of a cartouche which confirms that he was indeed a Kushite king. Alara is also mentioned as the brother of Taharqa's grandmother in inscriptions Kawa IV lines 16f (ca. 685 BC) and VI, lines 23f. (ca. 680 BC)

Nubiologist Timothy Kendall has claimed that Alara is the king 'Ary' Meryamun whose Year 23 is inscribed on a now fragmented stele from the Temple of Amun at Kawa. However, Hungarian Egyptologist László Török rejects this view and believes that Ary was rather Aryamani who was a much later Kushite post-25th dynasty king who ruled from Meroë due to the text and style of his stele. Kendall's epigraphic arguments here are also not accepted by other scholars.

== Tomb ==
Alara was succeeded in power by Kashta who extended Nubia's influence to Elephantine and Thebes. He was buried at the royal cemetery of El-Kurru downstream from Napata. Alara's wife, Queen Kasaqa, was buried in tomb Ku.23 (El-Kurru 23). Her tomb was located right next to tomb Ku.9 which is presumed to belong to Alara himself.

Kendall notes that the occupant of Ku.9 (likely Alara):

was interred in the traditional Nubian manner, lying on a bed and placed in a small enclosed side-chamber at the bottom of a vertical shaft, the visible tomb superstructure incorporated many Egyptian features. The apex seems to have been adorned with a crudely cast, hollow bronze ba statue...The chapel had contained a plain, hard stone Egyptian-style offering table, and the chapel walls had been adorned with crude low relief. One block preserved what appeared to be the upper part of a male head, wearing a crown with a superstructure and streamers and a loop-like ornament over the brow, imitative of a uraeus...This feature suggests either that the owner of the tomb, by the end of his reign, had come close to identifying himself as a true pharaoh, or that his successor (Kashta?) who would have built the tomb and authorized the reliefs, provided such sentiments in the posthumous depiction.

Török concurs and writes that "the mortuary cult chapel of Ku.9 seems to have been the first to be provided with a tomb stele and a funerary offering table" in el-Kurru, the royal burial grounds of the early Kushite kings.

Royal titles
| Unknown | Kushite king | Succeeded by Kashta |
