= Väröbacka =

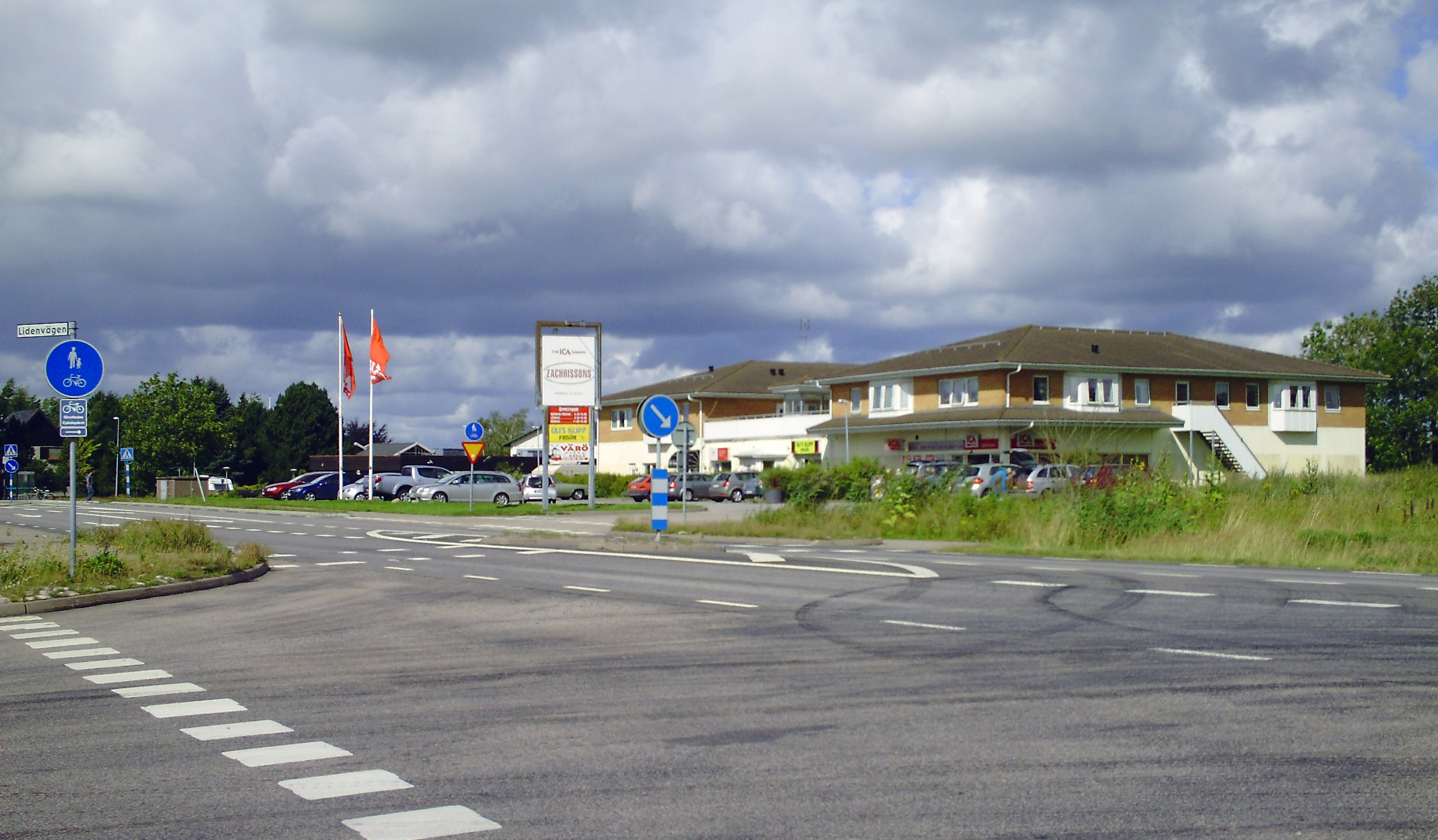
- Väröbacka in August 2011

- Location within Halland Location within Sweden
- Coordinates: 57°15′0″N 12°11′0″E
- Country: Sweden
- Province: Halland
- County: Halland County
- Municipality: Varberg Municipality

Area
  - Total: 0.95 km^{2} (0.37 sq mi)

Population (31 December 2010)
  - Total: 630
  - Density: 664/km^{2} (1,720/sq mi)
- Time zone: UTC+1 (CET)
  - Summer (DST): UTC+2 (CEST)

Väröbacka (Swedish pronunciation: [værœˈbâkːa]) is a locality situated in Varberg Municipality, Halland County, Sweden, with 630 inhabitants in 2010. Sunvära SK is a bandy club.
