= Py Sörman =

Swedish author (1897–1947)

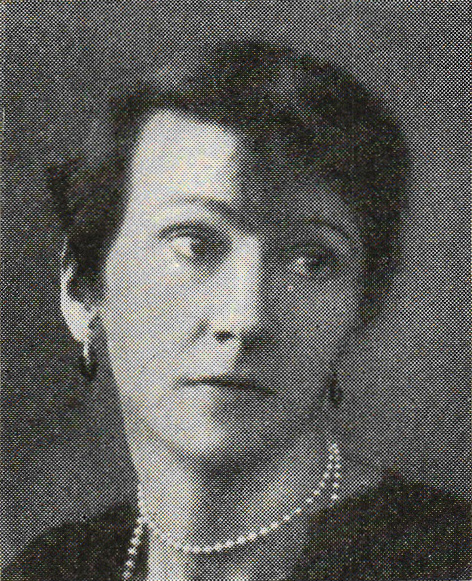
- Born: Ingrid Amalia Sörman; August 25, 1897; Väröbacka, Halland, Sweden
- Died: April 19, 1947 (aged 49); Stockholm, Sweden
- Occupations: Novelist, short story writer
- Writing career
- Pen name: Inge Forss
- Notable work: Aloë (1931)

Py Sörman (August 25, 1897 — April 19, 1947) was a Swedish author who wrote on morbid, feminist topics.

== Early life ==
Sörman was born Ingrid Amalia Sörman in Värö parsonage farm in Halland on August 25, 1897, to Johannes Söhrman and Sigrid Heüman. Her father was a clergyman. She went to primary school in Gothenburg at Fruntimmersföreningen, before starting high school and ultimately dropping out to pursue theatre.

== Career ==
Sörman published her first novel, Han, in 1921. Her second book, Särlinge – byn på slätten, was about her upbringing in the countryside. She published under the masculine name Inge Forss.

Sörman married Nils Lyberg in 1926. Together, they founded a short-lived theater in Gothenburg that ran for three productions. Lyberg died not long after from diabetes.

Her 1929 satirical novel Toto is generally considered her breakthrough work. Her 1931 novel Aloë was her best-selling work. It won 3rd place in a national Nordic literature competition.

In 1936, Sörman remarried to a doctor, Gunnar Forsberg, in Stockholm. Towards the end of her life, Sörman developed a strong interest in Roman Catholicism. During this time, she wrote biographies of notable Roman Catholic figures. Her 1942 biography of Queen Cristina of Sweden, Vi Christina med Guds nåde, is an example. In 1947, she formally converted to Roman Catholicism.

== Selected works ==
Sörman published over 30 short stories and novels, mostly with the Swedish publisher Albert Bonnier.

- Vi Christina med Guds nåde (1942)
- Aloë (1931)
- Adams revben (1929)
- Toto (1929)
- Särlinge – byn på slätten (1926)
- Han (1921)

== Later life and legacy ==
Sörman died in Stockholm on April 19, 1947. She is buried at the Catholic cemetery in Stockholm.
