= P-y method =

In geotechnical civil engineering, the p–y is a method of analyzing the ability of deep foundations to resist loads applied in the lateral direction. This method uses the finite difference method and p-y graphs to find a solution. P–y graphs are graphs which relate the force applied to soil to the lateral deflection of the soil. In essence, non-linear springs are attached to the foundation in place of the soil. The springs can be represented by the following equation:

$$p = ky$$

where $k$ is the non-linear spring stiffness defined by the p–y curve, $y$ is the deflection of the spring, and $p$ is the force applied to the spring.

The p–y curves vary depending on soil type.

The available geotechnical engineering software programs for the p–y method include FB-MultiPier by the Bridge Software Institute, DeepFND by Deep Excavation LLC, PileLAT by Innovative Geotechnics, LPile by Ensoft, and PyPile by Yong Technology.
