= Shabaka Stone =

Ancient Egyptian relic

Coordinates: 51.5193°N 0.1281°W

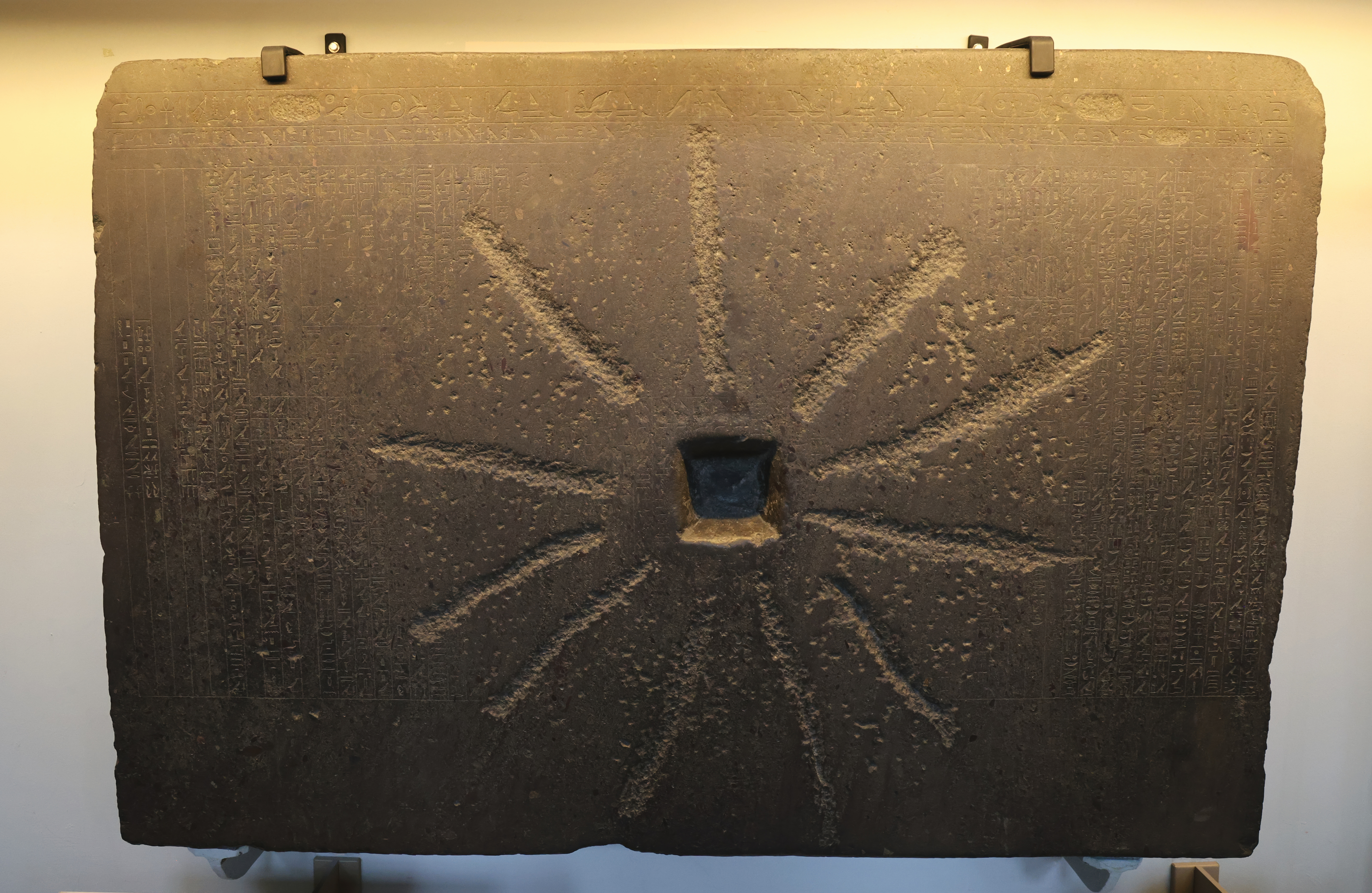
- Material: Granite
- Height: 95 cm
- Width: 137 cm
- Created: c. 722 BC
- Present location: British Museum, London

The Shabaka Stone, sometimes Shabako, is a relic incised with an ancient Egyptian religious text, which dates from the Twenty-fifth Dynasty of Egypt. In later years, the stone was likely used as a millstone, which damaged the hieroglyphs. This damage is accompanied by other intentional defacements, leaving the hieroglyphic inscription in poor condition.

== Provenance ==
=== Historical origins ===
Originally erected as a lasting monument at the Great Temple of Ptah in Memphis in the late eighth century BCE, the stone was at some point removed (for unknown reasons) to Alexandria during the Ptolemaic dynasty. From there, it was transported by a navy vessel from Alexandria to England. It was brought back as ballast along with a capital of an Egyptian column, fragments of a Greco-Roman black basalt capital, two fragments of quartzite lintel of Senusret III, and a black granite kneeling statue of Ramesses II. In 1805, the stone was donated to the British Museum by George Spencer, 2nd Earl Spencer (1758–1834), who was First Lord of the Admiralty and since 1794 the trustee of the museum. In 1901, the stone was deciphered, translated, and interpreted for the first time by the American Egyptologist James Henry Breasted. The monument has remained at the museum to the present day.

=== Dating ===
The stone's dedicatory introduction claims that it is a copy of the surviving contents of a worm-ridden, decaying papyrus found by the pharaoh Shabaka in the Great Temple of Ptah. Homer W. Smith dates the original text to the First Dynasty, calling it "the oldest written record of human thought".

Breasted, Adolf Erman, Kurt Sethe, and Hermann Junker all dated the stone to the Old Kingdom. The stone is archaic, both linguistically (its language is similar to that used in the Pyramid Texts of the Old Kingdom) and politically (it alludes to the importance of Memphis as the first royal city). As such, Henri Frankfort, John Wilson, Miriam Lichtheim, and Erik Iversen have also assessed the stone to be from the Old Kingdom. However, Friedrich Junge and most other scholars since then have argued that the monument was produced in the Twenty-fifth Dynasty. Today, scholars feel it is clear that it cannot predate the Nineteenth Dynasty.

== Composition ==
The stela is around 137 centimetres (54 in) wide, with the left side height estimated at 91 cm (36 in) and the right side about 95 cm (37 in). The written surface is 132 cm (52 in) in width and on average, 66 cm (26 in) in height. The rectangular hole in the center is 12 by 14 cm (4.7 by 5.5 in), with eleven radiating lines ranging in length from 25 to 38 cm (9.8 to 15.0 in), comprising an area 78 cm (31 in) across.

In 1901, Breasted identified the stone as a rectangular slab of black granite. While other scholars postulated that the monument was a slab or basalt or a conglomerate stone, a recent analysis by a scientist of the British Museum revealed the stone to be green breccia originating from Wadi Hammamat.

== Content ==
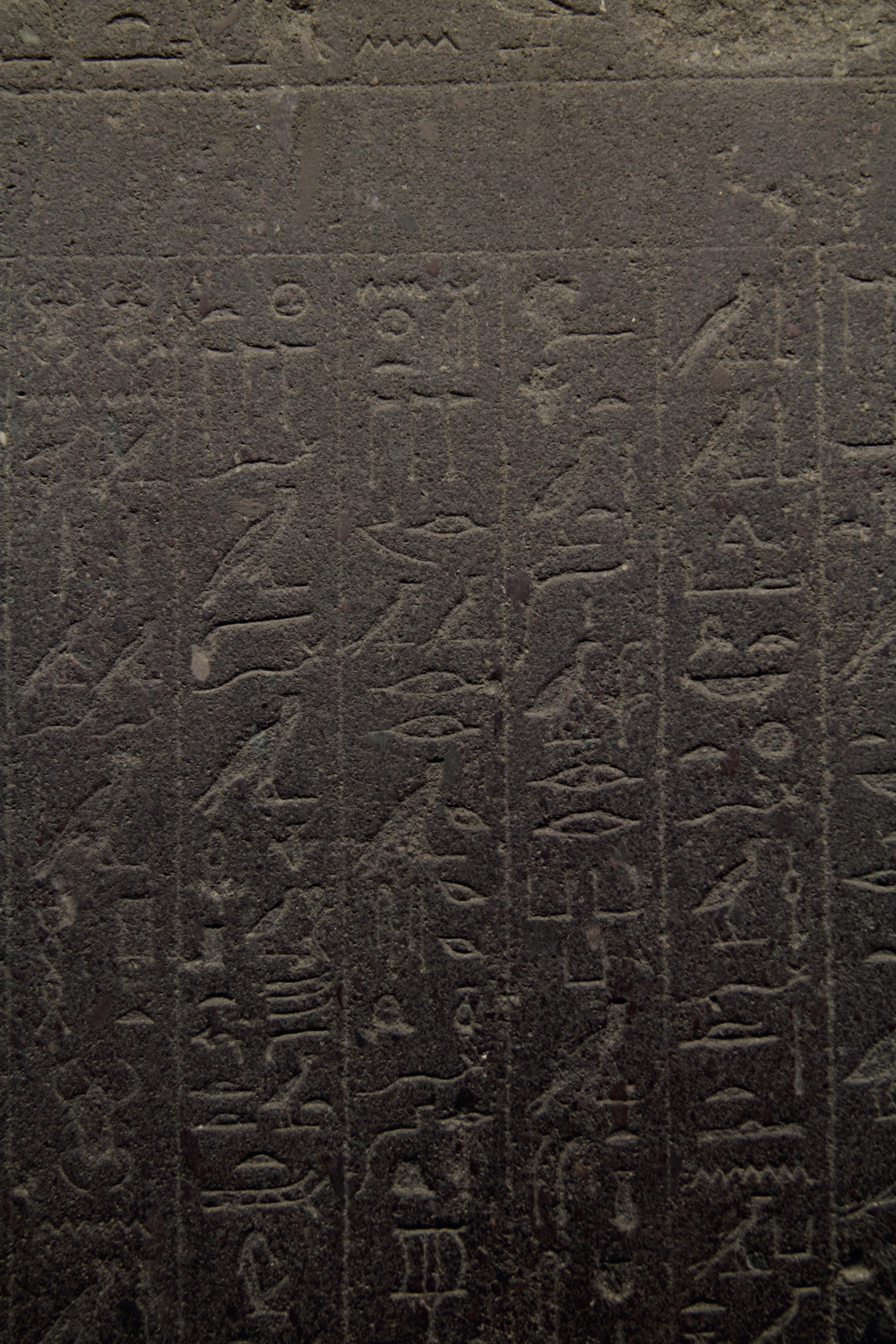
Detail of hieroglyphic inscription

The text includes two main divisions with a short introduction and an ending summary. The first division relates the unification of Upper and Lower Egypt. Ptah works through Horus to accomplish this unification. The other is a creation myth, the "Memphite Theology" or "Memphite Drama", that establishes Ptah as the creator of all things, including gods.

The text stresses that it is in Memphis that the unification of Egypt took place. The inscription also states that this town was the burial-place of Osiris, after he drifted ashore.

=== Introduction and titulary of the King ===
The first line of the stone presents the fivefold royal titulary of the king: "The living Horus: Who prospers the Two Lands; the Two Ladies: Who prospers the Two Lands; the King of Upper and Lower Egypt: Neferkare; the Son of Re: [Shabaka], beloved of Ptah-South-of-His-Wall, who lives like Re forever." The first three names emphasize the king's manifestation as a living god (especially of the falcon-headed Horus, patron god to the Egyptian kings), while the latter two names (the king's throne name and birth name) refer to Egypt's division and unification.

The second line, a dedicatory introduction, states that the stone is a copy of the surviving contents of a worm-eaten papyrus Shabaka found as he was inspecting the Great Temple of Ptah.

=== The Unification of Egypt ===
Lines 3 to 47 describe the unification of Upper and Lower Egypt under the god Horus at Memphis. The text first declares the political and theological supremacy of the Memphite god Ptah, the king of both Upper and Lower Egypt, and the creator of the Ennead. The inscription then describes how Horus, as a manifestation of Ptah, initially rules Lower Egypt while his rival Set rules Upper Egypt. However, Horus receives Upper Egypt from Geb, becoming the sole ruler of the land.

=== The Memphite Theology ===
Lines 48 to 64 recount the creation myth known as the Memphite Theology. Ptah, the patron god of craftsmen, metalworkers, artisans, and architects was viewed as a creator-god, a divine craftsman of the universe who was responsible for all existence. Creation was first a spiritual and intellectual activity, facilitated by the divine heart (thought) and tongue (speech/word) of Ptah. Then, creation became a physical activity carried out by Atum, who, created by Ptah's teeth and lips, produced the Ennead from his seed and hands.

Thus it is said of Ptah: “He who made all and created the gods.” And he is

Ta-tenen, who gave birth to the gods, and from whom every thing came

forth, foods, provisions, divine offerings, and all good things. Thus it is

recognized and understood that he is the mightiest of the gods. Thus Ptah

was satisfied after he had made all things and all divine word. . . . Indeed,

Ptah is the fountain of life for the gods and all material realities.

=== Summary ===
Lines 61 through 64 summarize the text as a whole.

== Purpose ==
According to Ragnhild Bjerre Finnestad, there are three theories on the possible purpose of the Shabaka text:

1. To assert the supremacy of the Memphite theological system over the Heliopolitan
2. To claim the hegemony of the Memphis and its priesthood over Heliopolis and its priesthood
3. To present an ontology.

As a temple text written down and set up in the temple of Ptah, it is likely that the Shabaka Stone served a religious, cultic-theological purpose, placing its subject matter within a cultic frame of reference.

== Damage ==
Projecting from the rectangular hole in the center of the stone are radial rough stripes, which destroyed the inscription within a radius of 78 cm, measured from the middle of the stone. According to the secondary literature on the monument, this damage occurred because the stone was re-used at some point as a millstone. The oldest reference speculating the stone's use as a millstone is found in the display of the British Museum of 1821. However, the stone could instead have been the foundation of something round, possibly a column or a pillar.

Some parts of the stone were intentionally cut out during the Dynastic Period. This included the name of Seth (line 7), a god which was condemned during this time. The names of all the other gods, including Horus, were left intact. Additionally, following the establishment of the Twenty-sixth Dynasty of Egypt, Psamtik II or Psamtik III erased the personal and throne names of Shabaka from the stone in an act of Damnatio memoriae. Psamtik III then engraved his name onto the stone, usurping it in the process, but his name was in turn erased by the Persians during their conquest of Egypt in 525 BC.

== See also ==
- List of individual rocks
