= Khensa =

Egyptian queen

- Queen consort of Nubia and Egypt; King's Wife, King's Sister, King's Daughter, etc
- Burial: Pyramid in Kuru, Nubia
- Spouse: Pharaoh Piye
- Issue: unknown
- Dynasty: 25th Dynasty of Egypt
- Father: possibly Kashta
- Mother: possibly Pebatjma

< Aa1 n n Aa17 E9 >
Khensa
in hieroglyphs
Era: 3rd Intermediate Period
(1069–664 BC)

Khensa (Khenensaiuw) was a Nubian queen dated to the Twenty-fifth Dynasty of Egypt.

Khensa is named as a King's Wife and King's Sister together with King Piye. This suggests she is the sister-wife of the Pharaoh and hence likely a daughter of Kashta and Pebatjma.

Her full titles include: Noble Lady (iryt p't), Great of Praises (wrt hzwt), Sweet of Love (bnrt mrwt), Beloved one of Wadjet (mryt w3Dt), Mistress of Grace (nbt im3t), Lady of all Woman (hnwt hmwt nbwt), King's Wife (hmt niswt), Great King's Wife (hmt niswt wrt), Lady of Upper and Lower Egypt (hnwt Sm'w mhw), Lady of the Two Lands (hnwt t3wy), King's Daughter (s3t niswt), King's Sister (snt niswt), and the one who pacifies the King every day (shtp niswt m hrt hrw).

Khensa is attested on a statue Louvre E 3915 - with Piye - dedicated to the goddess Bastet. She was buried in a pyramid at el-Kurru (Ku4). The tomb still contained parts of the funerary equipment such as an offering table, vases, canopic jars, etc.
