= Kashta =

King of Nubia c. 760–747 BCE

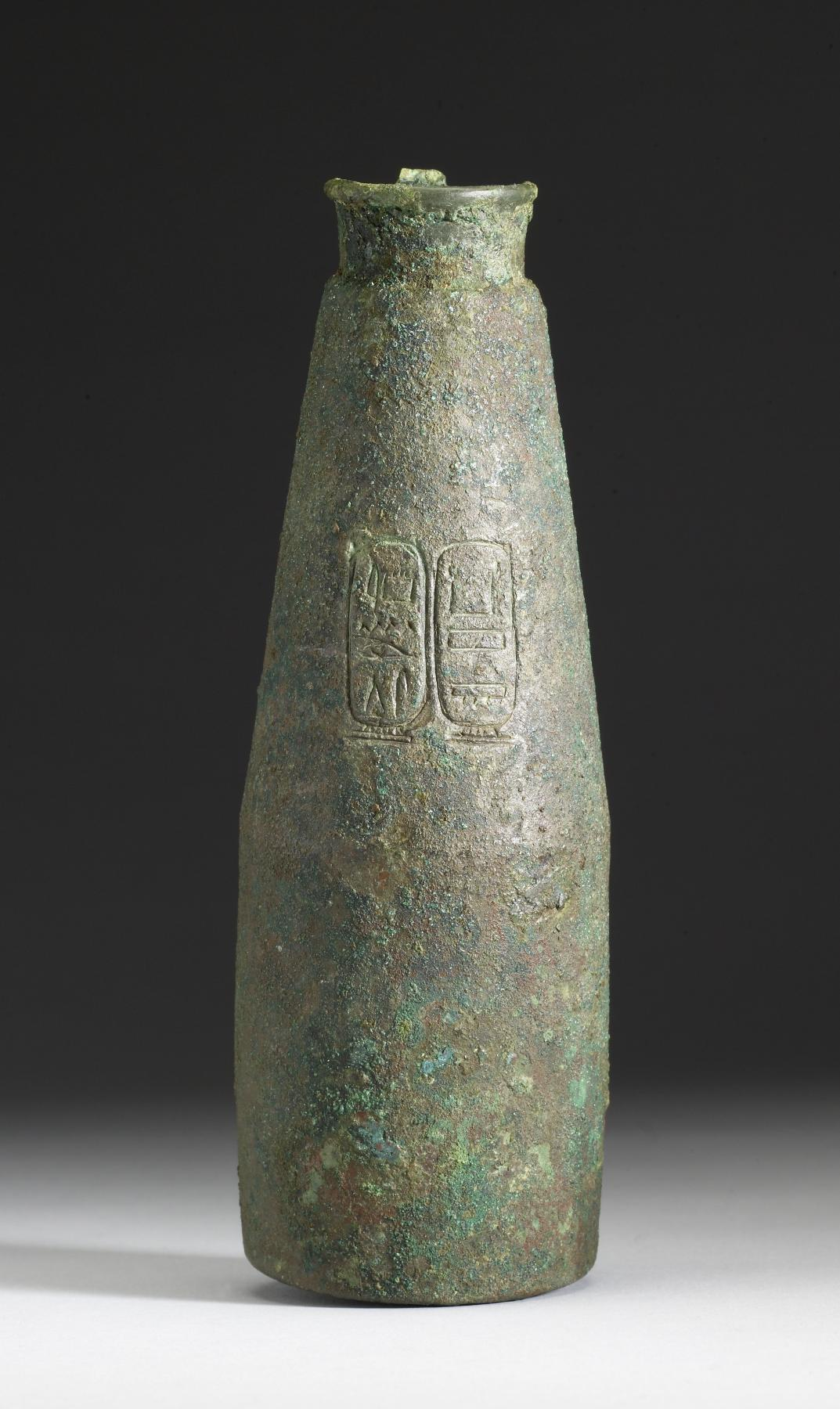
- Bronze situla with the names of Kashta and Amenirdis I. Walters Art Museum.

Kushite King of Napata
- Reign: c. 760–747 BC
- Predecessor: Alara
- Successor: Piye
Royal titulary
Prenomen
M3ˁ-Rˁ - Maa-Ra - Ra is justified

M23 X1 L2 X1	ra mA mAa
Nomen
k3š-t3 - Kashta

G39 N5	kA S tA
- Consort: Pebatjma
- Children: Piye, Shabaka (sons); Khensa, Peksater, Amenirdis I, Neferukakashta (daughters)
- Burial: el-Kurru

Kashta was an 8th-century BCE king of the Kushite Dynasty in ancient Nubia and the successor of Alara. His nomen k3š-t3 (transcribed as Kashta, possibly pronounced /kuʔʃi-taʔ/) "of the land of Kush" is often translated directly as "The Kushite". He was succeeded by Piye, who would go on to conquer ancient Egypt and establish the Twenty-Fifth Dynasty there.

== Family ==
Kashta is thought to either have been the brother of his predecessor Alara, or to have been unrelated. Both Alara and Kashta were thought to have married their sisters. These theories date back to the work of Dunham and Macadam, but Morkot points out that there is no clear evidence to support these assumptions.

Kashta's only known wife was Pebatjma. Several children and possible children are recorded:

- King Piye - Thought to be a son of Kashta. Possibly a son of Pebatjma
- King Shabaka - Mentioned as a brother of Amenirdis I, and hence a son of Kashta and Pebatjma.
- Queen Khensa - Wife of Piye, thought to be a daughter of Kashta and possibly Pebatjma.
- Queen Peksater (or Pekareslo) - She was married to Piye and was buried in Abydos. She may have died while accompanying Piye on a campaign to Egypt. Laming and Macadam suggest she was an adopted daughter of Pebatjma.
- God's Wife of Amun Amenirdis I. A statue of Amenirdis mentions she is the daughter of Kashta and Pebatjma.
- Neferukakashta - Thought to be a daughter of Kashta and possibly Pebatjma.

== Kushite rule of Upper Egypt under Kashta ==
While Kashta ruled Nubia from Napata, which is 400 km north of Khartoum, the modern capital of Sudan, he also exercised a strong degree of control over Upper Egypt by managing to install his daughter, Amenirdis I, as the presumptive God's Wife of Amun in Thebes in line to succeed the serving Divine Adoratrice of Amun, Shepenupet I, Osorkon III's daughter. This development was "the key moment in the process of the extension of Kushite power over Egyptian territories" under Kashta's rule since it officially legitimized the Kushite takeover of the Thebaid region. The Hungarian Kushite scholar, László Török, notes that there were probably already Kushite garrisons stationed in Thebes itself during Kashta's reign both to protect this king's authority over Upper Egypt and to thwart a possible future invasion of this region from Lower Egypt.

Török observes that Kashta's appearance as King of Upper and Lower Egypt and peaceful takeover of Upper Egypt is suggested both "by the fact that the descendants of Osorkon III, Takelot III and Rudamun continued to enjoy a high social status in Thebes in the second half of the 8th and in the first half of the 7th century" [BCE] as is shown by their burials in this city as well as the joint activity between the Divine Adoratrice Shepenupet I and the god's Wife of Amun Elect Amenirdis I, Kashta's daughter. A stela from Kashta's reign has been found in Elephantine (modern day Aswan)--at the local temple dedicated to the god Khnum—which attests to his control of this region. It bears his royal name or prenomen: Nimaatre. Egyptologists today believe that either he or more likely Piye was the Year 12 Nubian king mentioned in a well-known inscription at Wadi Gasus which associates the Adopted god's Adoratice of Amun, Amenirdis, Kashta's daughter together with Year 19 of the serving God's Wife of Amun, Shepenupet. Kashta's reign length is unknown. Some sources credit Kashta as the founder of the 25th dynasty since he was the first Kushite king known to have expanded his kingdom's influence into Upper Egypt. Under Kashta's reign, the native Kushite population of his kingdom, situated between the third and fourth Cataracts of the Nile, became rapidly 'Egyptianized' and adopted Egyptian traditions, religion and culture. Kashta's successor was Piye.

== Burial ==
The pyramids of el-Kurru contain the tombs of Kashta and several of his successors. The highest part of the cemetery contains 4 tumulus tombs (Tum.1,2,4 and 5). To the east of the tumulus tombs we find a row of at least eight pyramids. One of them partially intrudes on a tumulus tomb (Tum.19). The southernmost of this row of pyramids belong to Kashta (presumably to) his wife Pebatjma. Before this row is another row of pyramids which includes those of Piye, Shabaka and Tanutamani.
To the south of the (presumed) pyramid of Pebatjma one has to cross the southern wadi to reach the southern pyramids. These are the pyramids of the Queens: Naparaye (K.3), Khensa (K.4), Qalhata (K.5), and Arty (K.6).

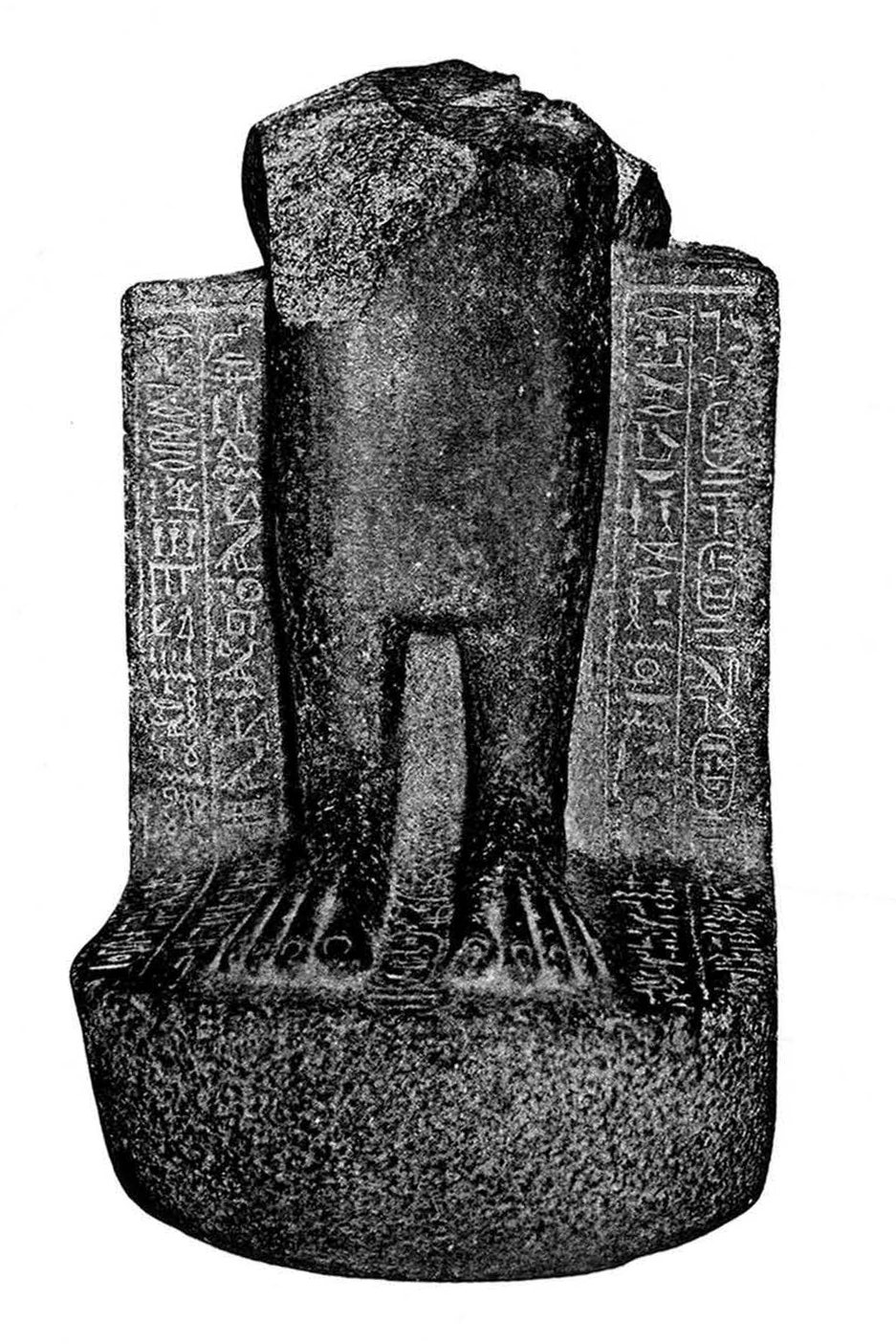
Sitting statue of the Divine Adoratrice of Amun, Amenardis I, daughter of pharaoh Kashta and queen Pebatjma. Cairo Museum (CG 42198)

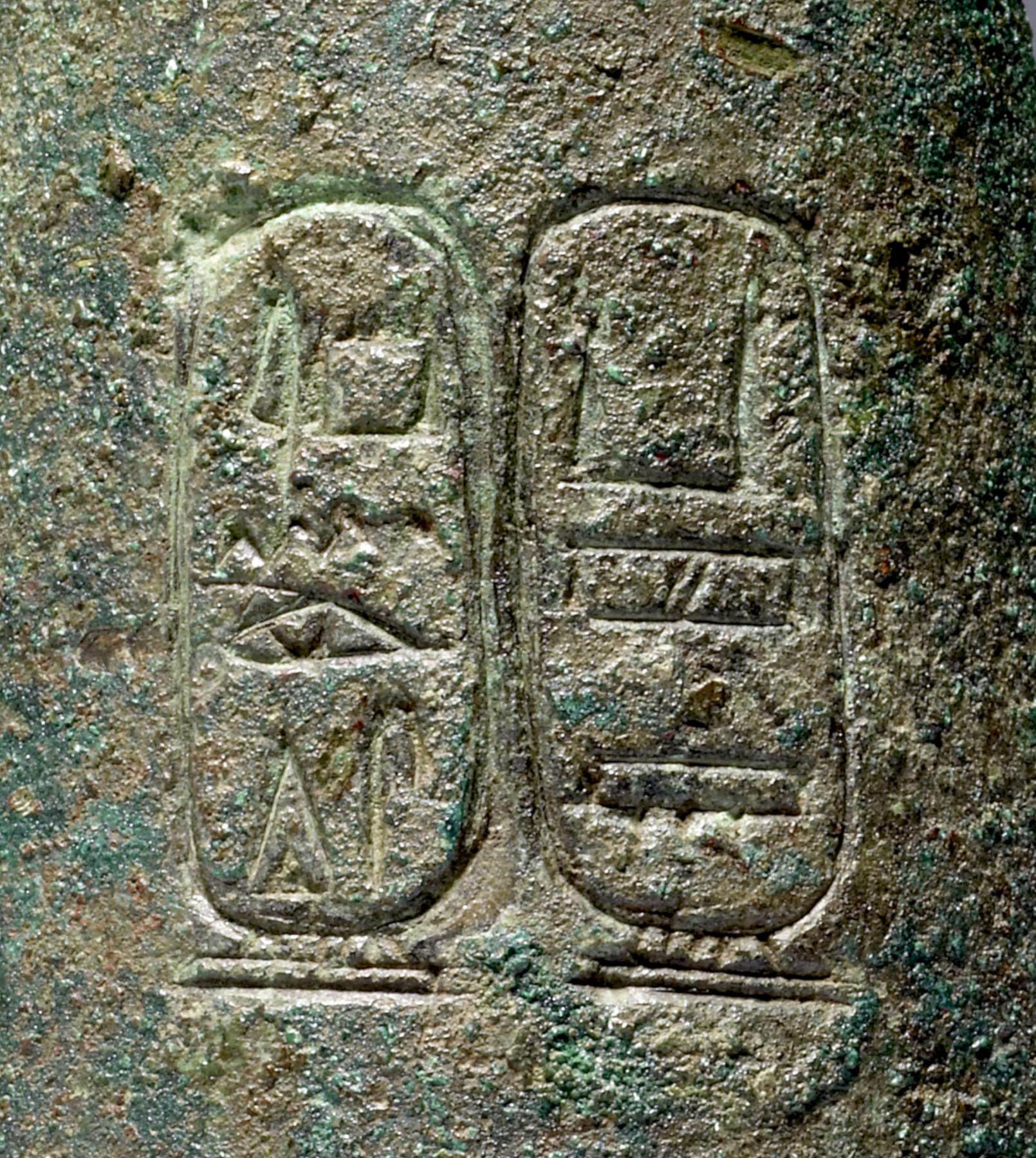
Egyptian - Situla Bearing the names of Kashta and Amenirdis

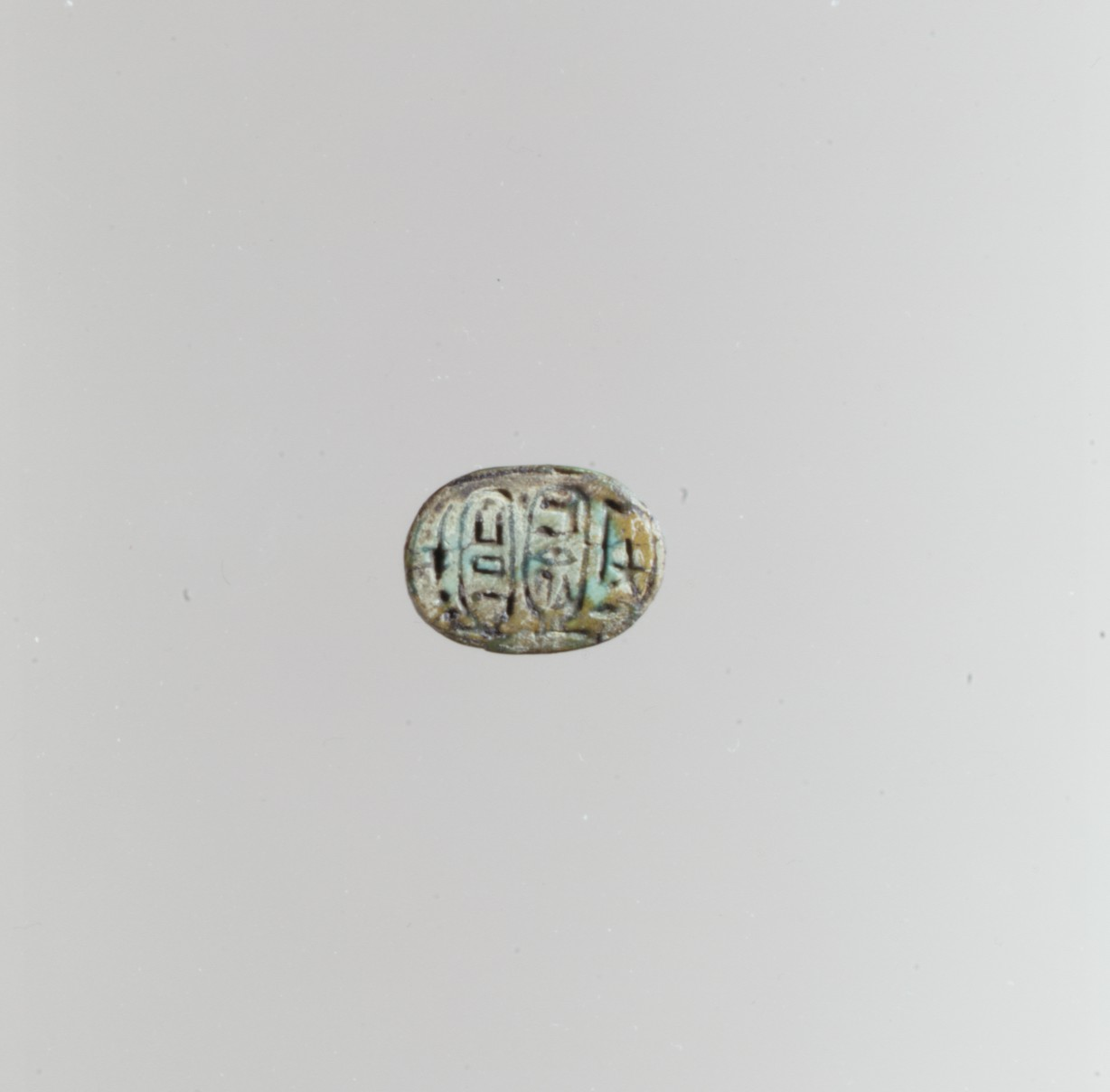
Scarab Inscribed With the Cartouches of Kashta and Amenirdis MET EG124

Preceded by Alara	Kushite king 25th Dynasty	Succeeded by Piye
