= Abar (queen) =

- Queen consort of Nubia and Egypt; King's Mother, Lady of Upper and Lower Egypt, etc
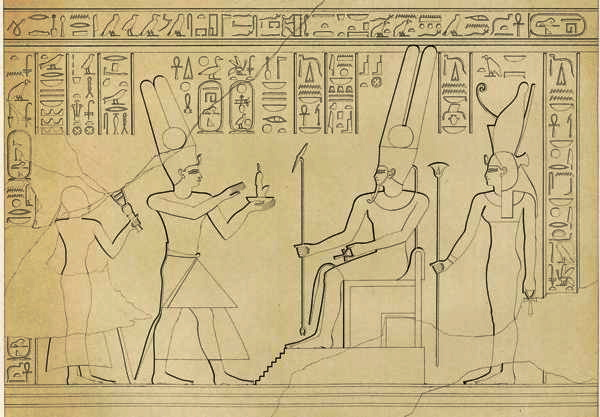
- Taharqa followed by his mother Queen Abar. Gebel Barkal - room C (Lepsius: Denkmäler)
- Burial: Possibly Nuri (Nuri 35)
- Spouse: Pharaoh Piye
- Issue: Pharaoh Taharqa
- Dynasty: 25th Dynasty of Egypt
- Mother: A sister of Alara of Nubia

Abar was a Nubian queen of the Kingdom of Kush dated to the Twenty-fifth Dynasty of Egypt. She is known from a series of stela found in Sudan and Egypt. Her appearances mark her as the niece of King Alara of Nubia, married to King Piye and the mother of King Taharqa.

== Life ==
< i A2 G29 E23 >
Abar
in hieroglyphs
Era: 3rd Intermediate Period
(1069–664 BC)

Abar, a Nubian queen of the Kingdom of Kush dated to the Twenty-fifth Dynasty of Egypt, is known from a stela (Stela V) found in Kawa, Sudan, recording that she was dedicated as a sistrum player at the temple by her father, as well in a similar scene at Jebel Barkal where she appears behind her son Taharqa and from a stela from Tanis, Egypt. Another appearance by Abar is at the Amun Temple at Sanam, Sudan.

Abar was the mother of King Taharqa and married to the King Piye. She was a niece of King Alara of Nubia (the daughter of his sister). She was separated from her son, Taharqa, for a long period of time and when they were reunited there was much rejoicing as he had become Pharaoh in her absence. This may have been a deliberate reference to the separation of the Egyptian god Isis and her son Horus, who reunited under similar circumstances. An alternative theory is that the separation of mother and son was a tradition in the Kushite culture.

She held several titles: King's Mother (mwt niswt), King's Sister (snt niswt), Mistress of the foreign lands (nbt kh3swt), Lady of Upper and Lower Egypt (hnwt Sma'w mhw), Great Lady of the Two Lands (wrt nbt t3wy), Noble Lady (iryt p't), Great of Praises (wrt hzwt), and Sweet of Love (bnrt mrwt). Records of Abar represent the earliest recording of the power of Queens in the Kingdom of Kush. Reisner proposed that Abar may be buried in Nuri in tomb 35.
