= Tabekenamun =

- Queen consort of Nubia and Egypt
- Spouse: Possibly Pharaoh Taharqa
Names
- Tabekenamun or Tabakenamun
- Dynasty: 25th Dynasty of Egypt
- Father: King Piye

t A G29 V31 n i mn n B1
Tabekenamun
in hieroglyphs
Era: 3rd Intermediate Period
(1069–664 BC)

Tabekenamun (Tabakenamun) was a Nubian queen dated to the Twenty-fifth Dynasty of Egypt.

Tabekenamun was a daughter of King Piye and may have been a queen consort to her brother Taharqa. She is known from Cairo Statue 49157 from Karnak.

Others have suggested Tabekenamun was the wife of Shabaka. She was a King's Daughter, King's Sister and King's Wife. In addition, she was a priestess of Hathor, Mistress of Tepihu (Aphroditopolis) and a priestess of Hathor of Iunyt (Dendera) as well as a priestess of Neith. The priestly offices could suggest she was a daughter of one of the Libyan Pharaohs.
