= Amenirdis I =

Ancient Egyptian princess and priestess, God's Wife of Amun

- Divine Adoratrice of Amun; God's Wife of Amun
- Statue of Amenirdis
Egyptian name
Royal titulary
Prenomen
< t G14 F35 F35 F35 N28 >
Hatneferumut
Ḥˁt-nfrw-Mwt
Nomen
< i mn n r rdi s >
Amenirdis (Meritmut)
Jmn-'jr-dj-sj (mrjt-Mwt)
Amenirdis, (beloved of Mut)
- Tenure: 714–700 BCE
- Predecessor: Shepenupet I
- Successor: Shepenupet II
- Dynasty: 25th Dynasty
- Burial: Medinet Habu
- Father: Kashta
- Mother: Pebatjma

Amenirdis I also spelled Amnéritis, Amenaedais (throne name: Hatneferumut (Note: She who Appears in the Perfection of Mut)) was a God's Wife of Amun during the 25th Dynasty of ancient Egypt. Originating from the Kingdom of Kush, she was the daughter of Pharaoh Kashta and Queen Pebatjma, and was later adopted by Shepenupet I. She went on to rule as high priestess, and has been shown in several artefacts from the period.

== Biography ==
During the 25th and 26th Dynasties, the office of "Divine Wife" acquired a new significance. From that time on, the Divine Wives were princesses of royal lineage who never married an earthly king; their royal spouse was the god Amun. For this reason, they were regarded as queens and bore the corresponding titles. Succession took place through adoption, with the "daughter" succeeding the "mother" upon the latter's death. In the Theban theocratic state, the Divine Wife exercised royal or princely authority—acting, to a certain extent, as the king's successor—while the importance of her priestly functions simultaneously increased.
Amenirdis I was a Kushite princess, the daughter of Pharaoh Kashta and Queen Pebatjma. She is likely to have been the sister of pharaohs Shabaka and Piye. Kashta arranged to have Amenirdis I adopted by the Divine Adoratrice of Amun, Shepenupet I, at Thebes as her successor. This shows that Kashta already controlled Upper Egypt prior to the reign of Piye, his successor.

She ruled as high priestess approximately between 714 and 700 BCE, under the reigns of Shabaka and Shabataka, and she adopted Piye's daughter Shepenupet II (Note: Shepenwepet II was the daughter of Piankhi and sister of Taharqa) as her successor. She also held the priestly titles of Divine Adoratrice of Amun and God's Hand.Both Amenirdis I and Shepenwepet II, were “the nominal heads of the Theban theocracy” for the duration of Nubian rule in Egypt. Upon her death, she was buried in a tomb in the grounds of Medinet Habu.

She is depicted in the Osiris-Hekadjet Osiris, Ruler of Eternity temple in the Karnak temple complex, and in Bab El-Gasus (Note: Bab el-Gasus at Deir el-Bahari; the tomb of the priests and priestesses of Amun.), along with Shepenupet I. She is mentioned on two offering tables, five statues, a stela and several small objects including scarabs. A statue of Amenirdis I carved from granitoid and decorated in gold leaf is held by the Nubian Museum in Aswan, Upper Egypt. The statue itself shows her decorated in the Egyptian style, with similarities to depictions of Isis and Hathor.

== Chapel ==
Madinet_Habu Ramesses III tample (☆), chapels of God's Wife of Amun, Amenridis I and Shepenupet II. (O)

Ameniridis chapel at Madinet Habu
Chapel’s fasade - seen from the West

Located within the temple enclosure at Medinet Habu, the funerary chapel of Amenirdis I is situated to the southeast of the mortuary temple of Ramesses III. The chapel was once second in a row of four chapels constructed for the God’s Wives of Dynasties Twenty-three to Twenty-six. The chapels stood to the south of the main axis of the Great Temple at Medinet Habu, with their façades facing the Eighteenth Dynasty temple of Amun, constructed by Hatshepsut and Thutmose III The chapel was first cleared in 1895, but it was not until the middle of the 20th century that the architecture of the chapels was surveyed and published. Of the four original chapels, only the two central ones, belonging to the Nubian God’s Wives of Amun, Amenirdis I and Shepenupet II, are still preserved. Of the four funerary chapels constructed for the God’s Wives at Medinet Habu, the chapel of Amenirdis is the best preserved. A narrow doorway in its single-towered pylon-facade leads to a columned court. Currently, only the bases of the four columns that once stood in the court are preserved. The South wall of the court also forms the facade of Amenirdis’s cult chapel. A single chamber constitutes the shrine that covers the tomb of Amenirdis I. This chamber is located inside a larger building, and a narrow corridor surrounded the shrine of Amenirdis. The burial chamber was located beneath her cult chamber. Both the crypt and the cella are devoid of inscriptions. Instead, scenes pertaining to Amenirdis’s funerary service, along with funerary texts, whose aim was to revive her, are located on the inner and other walls of the corridor created between the two structures.

At the southern end of the East Wall, the texts commence with a representation of Amenirdis standing before an offering table. An offering list is inscribed just above the table. Immediately following this vignette is Shepenwepet’s dedicatory inscription, in which she declares, "I have erected this monument for eternity for her mother Amenirdis":

Ho God’s Wife, Divine Adoratrice, king’s daughter of the Lord of the Two Lands Kashta, justified,
God’s Hand, Amenirdis, justified! Provide yourself with the Eye of Horus
the Red Crown, rich in ba-power and many-natured,
that they may protect you, just as it protects her Horus;
that it may set your ba-power, O God’s Wife, Divine Adoratrice, Mistress of the Two Lands,
Amenirdis, justified, at the head of the Ennead, as the serpent-goddess who is at your brow.
Raise yourself, O God’s Wife, Divine Adoratrice, King’s daughter of the Lord of the Two Lands Kashta, justified,
God’s hand, Amenirdis, justified, that they may guide you to your mother Nut, who grasps your arm.

== Gallery ==
Chapel of Amenirdis – Reconstruction

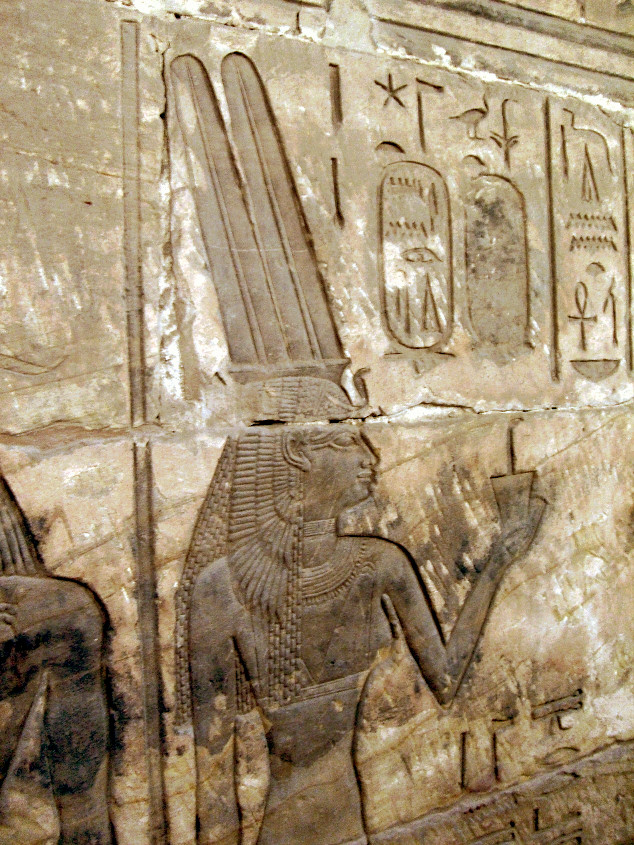
God's Wife of Amun, Amenirdis - Chapels at Medinet Habu

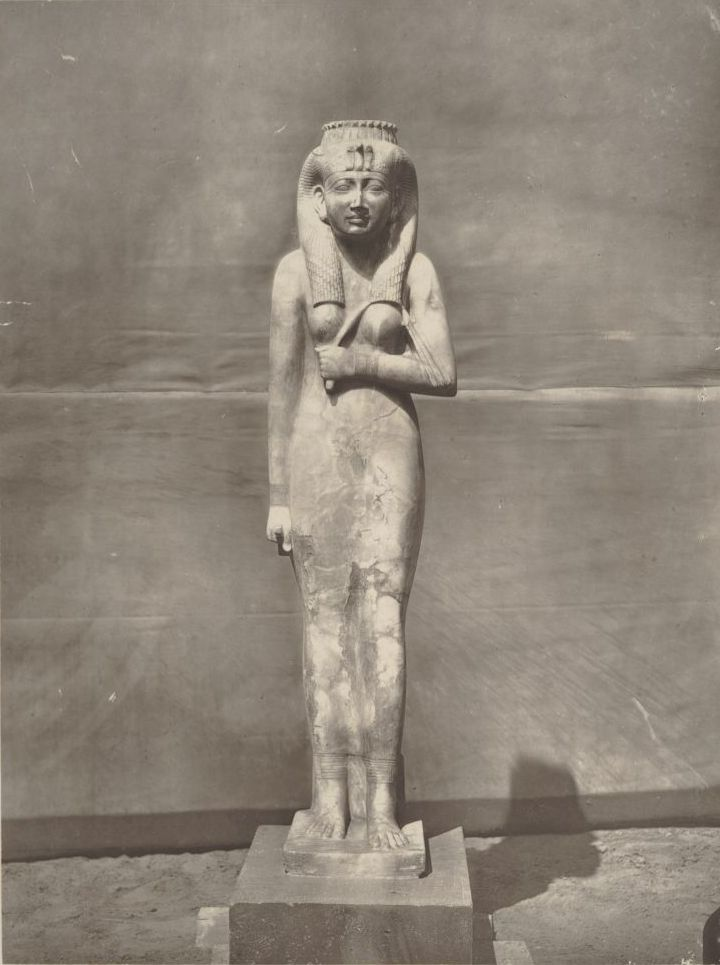
A sculpture of Amneritis; Karnak

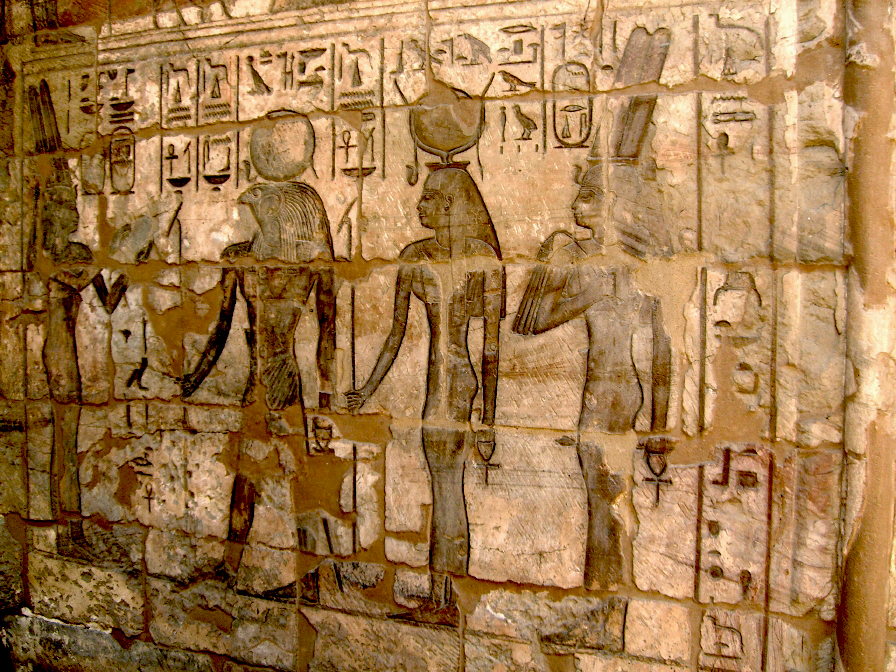
Chapels of God's Wife Amenridis I; Medinet Habu

Amenirdis I; British Museum

The statue of the god Amun and the God's Wife Amenirdis I.

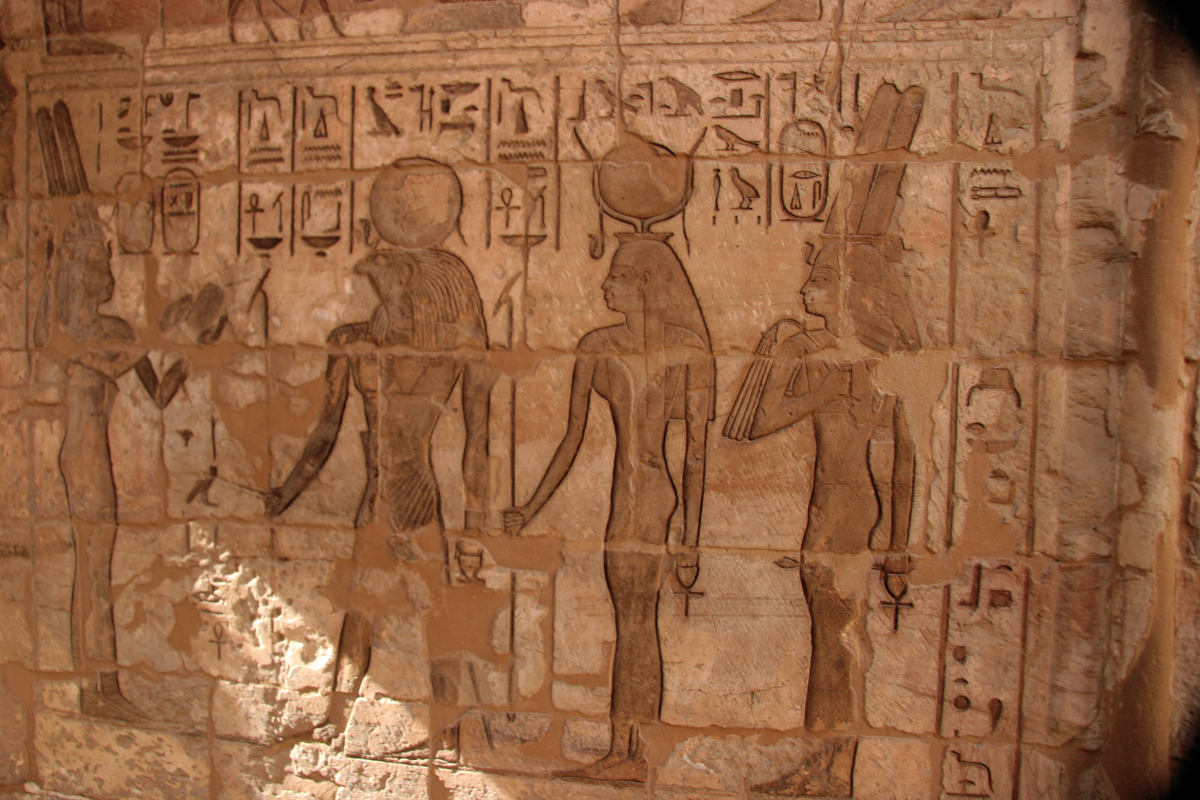
Divine queen Shepenupet II stands for the gods: Ra-Horakhti, Isis and Amenirdis; temple Ramesses III

The funerary chapels of the God's Wives of Amun—Amenirdis I, Shepenupet II , and Nitocris I; Medinet Habu

Vase of Hatneferumu-Amenirdis I ;Museum of Grenoble

== Footnotes ==
Preceded by Shepenupet I	God's Wife of Amun	Succeeded by Shepenupet II
Preceded by Shepenupet I	Divine Adoratrice of Amun	Succeeded by Shepenupet II
