= Shabaka =

Egyptian pharaoh

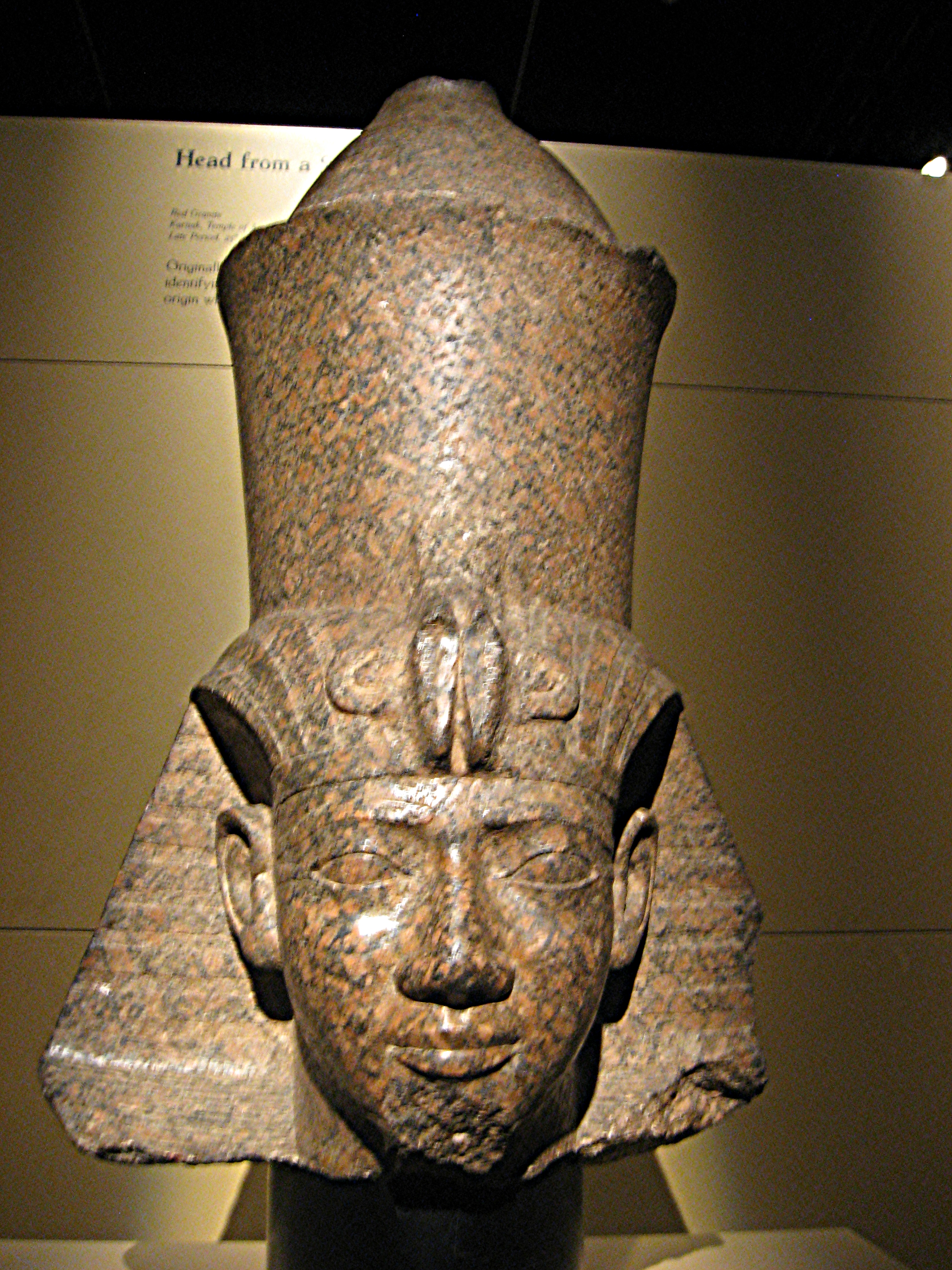
- Sphinx head of Shabaka, on display at the Egyptian Museum, Cairo

Pharaoh
- Reign: 705–690 BC
- Predecessor: Shebitku
- Successor: Taharqa
Royal titulary
Horus name
- Sebeqtawy
- The one who has blessed the Two Lands
G5	s b q N17 N17
Nebty name
- Sebeqtawy
- The one who has blessed the Two Lands
G16	s b q N17 N17
Golden Horus
- Sebeqtawy
- The one who has blessed the Two Lands
G8	s b q N17 N17
Prenomen
- Neferkare
- Beautiful is the Soul of Re

M23 X1 L2 X1	ra nfr kA
Nomen
Shabaka

G39 N5	SA E10 kA
- Consorts: Qalhata, Mesbat, possibly Tabekenamun
- Children: Tantamani, Haremakhet, Piankharty, Isetemkheb
- Father: Kashta
- Mother: Pebatjma
- Died: 690 BC
- Burial: el-Kurru
- Monuments: Shabaka Stone
- Dynasty: 25th Dynasty

Neferkare Shabaka, Shabako or Sabaco in Meroitic (Meroitic: 𐦰𐦲𐦡𐦐𐦲 (sa-ba-co), Egyptian: 𓆷𓃞𓂓 šꜣ bꜣ kꜣ, Assyrian: Ša-ba-ku-u, Šabakû) was the third Kushite pharaoh of the Twenty-fifth Dynasty of Egypt, who reigned from 705 to 690 BC. The Greek sources (which include both Herodotus and Manetho) call him Sabakōn (Σαβακῶν) or, more likely, given current understanding of the order of kings and the stated reign-lengths, Sebikhōs (Σεβιχὼς). He ruled from the city of Napata, located deep in Nubia, modern-day Sudan. His burial at el-Kurru (Tomb Ku 15). Shabaka succeeded in preserving Egypt's independence from outside forces particularly the Neo-Assyrian Empire of Sargon II

== Shabaka's timeline ==
The archaeological evidence now in 2016–2017 firmly favours a Shebitku-Shabaka succession. Gerard Broekman's GM 251 (2017) paper shows that Shebitku reigned before Shabaka since the upper edge of Shabaka's NLR #30's Year 2 Karnak quay inscription was carved over the left-hand side of the lower edge of Shebitku's NLR#33 Year 3 inscription. This can only mean that Shabaka ruled after Shebitku. The Egyptologist Claus Jurman's personal re-examination of the Karnak quay inscriptions of Shebitku (or Shabataka) and Shabaka in 2016 and 2017 conclusively demonstrate that Shebitku ruled before Shabaka and corroborates Broekman's arguments that Shebitku's Nile Text inscription was carved before Shabaka's inscription; hence, Shebitku ruled before Shabaka.

Critically, Frédéric Payraudeau writes in French that "the Divine Adoratrix or God's Wife of Amun Shepenupet I, the last Libyan Adoratrix, was still alive during the reign of Shebitku because she is represented performing rites and is described as "living" in those parts of the Osiris-Héqadjet chapel built during his reign (wall and exterior of the gate). In the rest of the room, it is Amenirdis I, Shabaka's sister), who is represented with the Adoratrix title and provided with a coronation name. The succession Shepenupet I—Amenirdis I as God's Wife of Amun or Divine Adoratrix thus took place during the reign of Shebitku. This detail in itself is sufficient to show that the reign of Shabaka cannot precede that of Shebitku.

The construction of the tomb of Shebitku (Ku. 18) resembles that of Piye (Ku. 17) while that of Shabaka (Ku. 15) is similar to that of Taharqa (Nu. 1) and Tantamani (Ku. 16). This also favours a Shebitku-Shabaka succession in the 25th dynasty. One of the strongest evidence that Shabaka ruled after Shebitku was demonstrated by the architectural features of the Kushite royal pyramids in El Kurru. Only in the pyramids of Piye (Ku 17) and Shebitku (Ku 18) are the burial-chambers open-cut structures with a corbelled roof, whereas fully tunnelled burial chamber substructures are found in the pyramids of Shabaka (Ku 15), Taharqa (Nu 1) and Tantamani (Ku 16), as well as with all subsequent royal pyramids in El Kurru and Nuri. The fully tunnelled and once decorated burial chamber of Shabaka's pyramid was clearly an architectural improvement since it was followed by Taharqa and all his successors. The pyramid design evidence also shows that Shabaka must have ruled after—and not before—Shebitku.

In the Cairo CG 42204 of the High Priest of Amun, Haremakhet—son of Shabaka—calls himself as "king's son of Shabaka, justified, who loves him, Sole Confidant of king Taharqa, justified, Director of the palace of the king of Upper and Lower Egypt Tanutamun/Tantamani, may he live for ever." However, no mention of Haremakhet's service under Shebitku is made; even if Haremakhet was only a youth under Shebitku, this king's absence is strange since the intent of the statue's text was to render a chronological sequence of kings who reigned during Horemakhet's life, each of their names being accompanied by a reference to the relationship that existed between the king mentioned and Horemakhet. This implies that when Haremakhet was born, king Shebitku was already dead, which would favour a Shebitku-Shabaka succession.

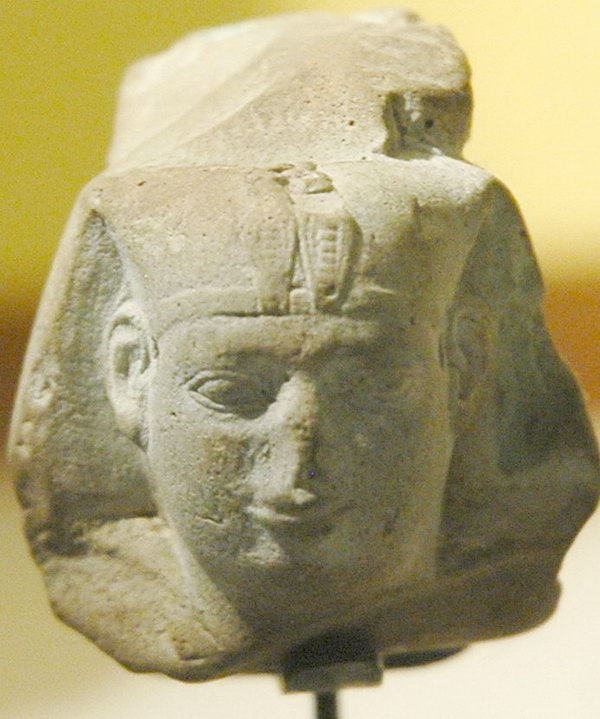
Portrait of Shabaqa

Payraudeau notes that Shebitku's shabtis are small (about 10 cm) and have a very brief inscription with only the king's birth name in a cartouche preceded by "the Osiris, king of Upper and Lower Egypt" and followed by mȝʿ-ḫrw. They are thus very close to those of Piye/Piankhy [42 – D. Dunham, (see footnote 39), plate 44.]. However, Shabaka's shabtis are larger (about 15–20 cm) with more developed inscriptions, including the quotation from the Book of the Dead, which is also present on those Taharqo, Tanouetamani and Senkamanisken." All this evidence suggests that Shebitku ruled before Shabaka. Additionally, Payraudeau observes that in the traditional Shabaka-Shebitku arrangement, the time span between the reign of Taharqa and Shabaka would be excessively long. He notes that Papyrus Louvre E 3328c from Year 2 or Year 6 of Taharqa mentions the sale of a slave by his owner who had bought him in Year 7 of Shabaka, that is 27 years earlier in the traditional chronology but if the reign of Shabaka is placed just before that of Taharqa (with no intervening reign of Shebitku), there is a gap of about 10 years which is much more credible.

The German scholar Karl Jansen Winkeln also endorsed a Shebitku-Shabaka succession in a JEH 10 (2017) N.1 paper titled 'Beiträge zur Geschichte der Dritten Zwischenzeit', Journal of Egyptian History 10 (2017), pp. 23–42 when he wrote a postscript stating "Im Gegensatz zu meinen Ausführungen auf dem [2014] Kolloquium in Münster bin ich jetzt der Meinung, dass die (neue) Reihenfolge Schebitku—Schabako in der Tat richtig ist..." or 'In contrast to my exposition at the [2014] Munster colloquium, I am now of the opinion that the (new) succession Shebitku-Shabako is in fact correct...'

== Family ==
Shabaka is thought to be the son of King Kashta and Pebatjma, although a text from the time of Taharqa could be interpreted to mean that Shabaka was a brother of Taharqa and hence a son of Piye.

Shabaka's Queen Consort was Qalhata, according to Assyrian records, a sister of Taharqa. Shabaka and Qalhata were the parents of King Tantamani and possibly the parents of King Shebitku as well, but this conflicts with evidence in favor of Shabaka ruling after Shebitku.

It is possible that Queen Tabekenamun was a wife of Shabaka. She is thought by some to be a wife of Taharqa.

Shabaka's son Haremakhet became High Priest of Amun and is known from a statue and a fragment of a statue found in Karnak. A lady named Mesbat is mentioned on the sarcophagus of Haremakhet and may be his mother.

Shabaka is the father of at least two more children, but the identity of their mother is not known. Piankharty later became the wife of her (half-)brother Tantamani. She is depicted on the Dream Stela with him. Isetemkheb H likely married Tantamani as well. She was buried in Abydos, Egypt.

== Biography ==
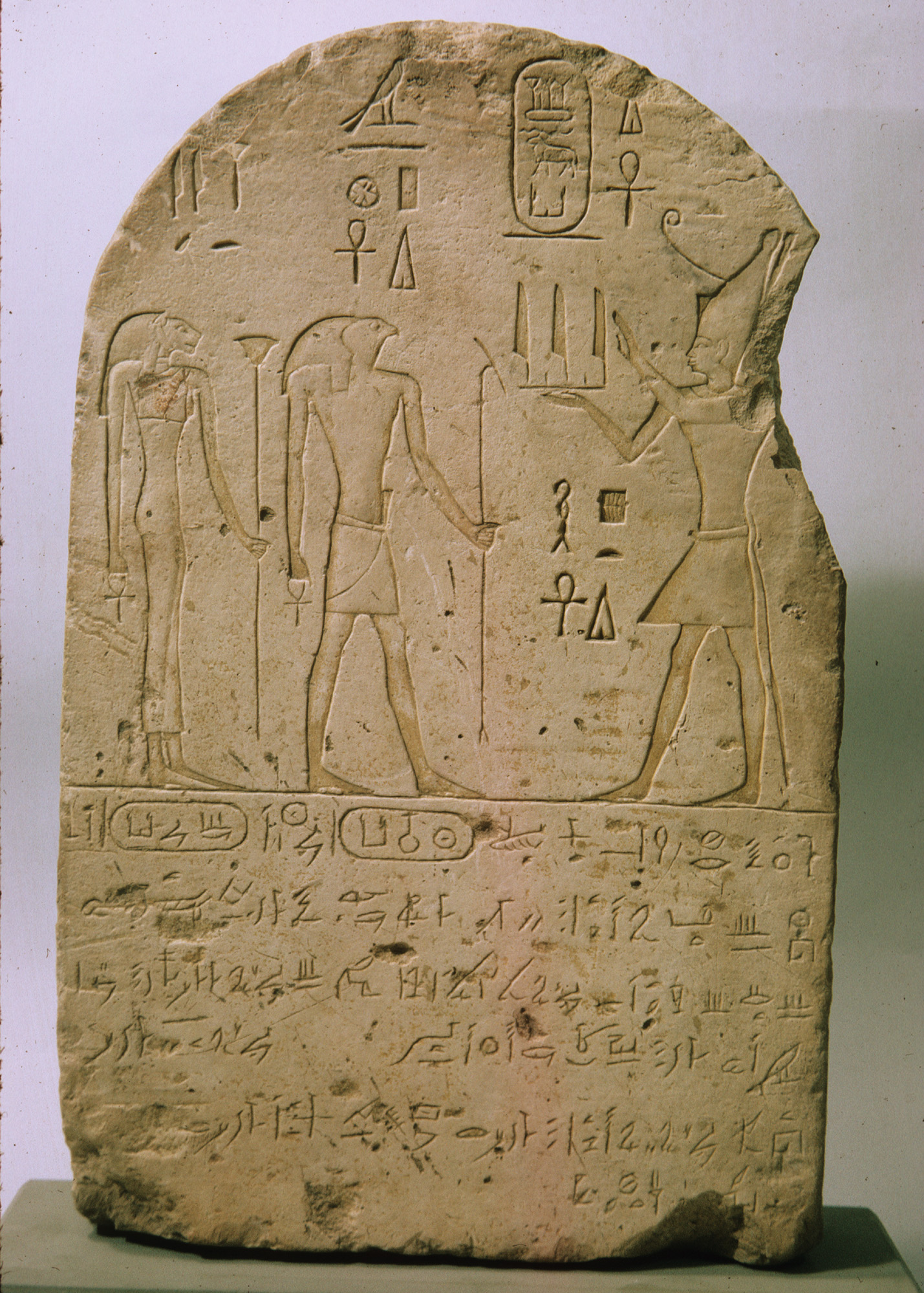
Donation stela of Shabaka. Shabaka appears standing to the right, with the cartouche designating him.

Shabaka succeeded Shebitku on the throne, and adopted the throne name of the Sixth Dynasty ruler Pepi II Neferkare. Shabaka's reign was initially dated from 716 BC to 702 BC by Kenneth Kitchen. However, new evidence indicates that Shebitku died around 705 BC because Sargon II (722–705 BC) of Assyria states in an official inscription at Tang-i Var (in northwest Iran)—which is datable to 706 BC—that it was Shebitku, Shabaka's predecessor, who extradited Iamanni of Ashdod to Shebitku as king of Egypt. This view has been accepted by many Egyptologists today such as Aidan Dodson, Rolf Krauss, David Aston, and Karl Jansen-Winkeln among others because there is no concrete evidence for coregencies or internal political/regional divisions in the Nubian kingdom during the Twenty-fifth Dynasty. This point was also stressed by Dan'el Kahn in an important 2006 article. All contemporary records suggest that the Nubian Pharaohs ruled Egypt with only a single king on the throne, while Taharqa states explicitly on one of his Kawa steles that he assumed power only after the death of his brother, Shebitku.

Shabaka's reign is significant because he consolidated the Nubian Kingdom's control over all of Egypt from Nubia down to the Delta region. It also saw an enormous amount of building work undertaken throughout Egypt, especially at the city of Thebes, which he made the capital of his kingdom. In Karnak he erected a pink granite statue of himself wearing the twin crowns of Egypt. Shabaka succeeded in preserving Egypt's independence from outside foreign powers—especially the Neo-Assyrian Empire of Sargon II. The most famous relic from Shabaka's reign is the Shabaka Stone which records several Old Kingdom documents that the king ordered preserved.

Also notable is the Shabaka Gate, a large stone door unearthed by archeologists in 2011 and believed to have guarded the room where the king's treasures were stored. Despite being relative newcomers to Egypt, Shabaka and his family were immensely interested in Egypt's past and the art of the period reflects their tastes which harked back to earlier periods.

== Shabaka's Memory after his Reign ==
When the succeeding 26th Dynasty of Egypt ruled Egypt under Psamtik I (664-610 BC), this pharaoh made no efforts to destroy monuments of the preceding Nubian 25th dynasty Nubian dynasty since it was the Assyrians who had expelled the Kushite kings from Egypt. Corey Chimko notes that:

"Several other monuments [of Psamtik I] show at least a respect for, if not an affinity with, the Nubian pharaohs on the part of Psamtik I: blocks from the temple of Mut at Karnak record his name alongside the celebrated Saïte general Somtutefnakht; a scene from the Wadi Gasous shows Psamtik I offering to Min in the presence of Nitocris and Shepenwepet, who is unashamedly labeled “daughter of king Pi(ankh)y, justified”; the funerary monuments of Shepenwepet II, which were modified by Nitocris for herself and her mother, maintain the designation of Amonirdis I as “daughter of king Kashta” and Shepenwepet II as “daughter of king Piankhy”; Shepenwepet II is also mentioned as “daughter of king Pi(ankh)y” in the tomb of Pabes, an attendant of Nitocris and on an offering table from the tomb of Montuemhat; and lastly, an Apis stela from Psamtik I’s twentieth year records the Apis’ birth in year twenty-six of Taharqa, a date that could easily have been reckoned in terms of the years of Psamtik’s father Necho I if there had been any reason to defame the memory of the Nubian ruler."

The situation changed dramatically under Psamtik II (595-589 BC) who mutilated the monuments of the preceding Nubian kings and militarily campaigned south into Nubia in his Year 3 and sacked their capital of Napata. However, despite's Psamtik II's attacks, many of the virtuous deeds of the Nubian kings outlived his efforts and the memory of Shabaka's reign survived. After the Saite dynasty, Shabaka's memory was still so revered that the Egyptians "had a street named after him in Late Period Memphis, and whose inscriptions were restored in the Ptolemaic period [of Egypt]. Even the Greek historians speak of him highly."

== Death ==
Shabaka is assumed to have died in his 15th regnal year based on BM cube statue 24429, which is dated to Year 15, II Shemu day 11 of Shabaka's reign. Shabaka was buried in a pyramid at el-Kurru and was succeeded by Taharqa, who would be his nephew if Shabaka was indeed a son of Kashta.

== Image gallery ==
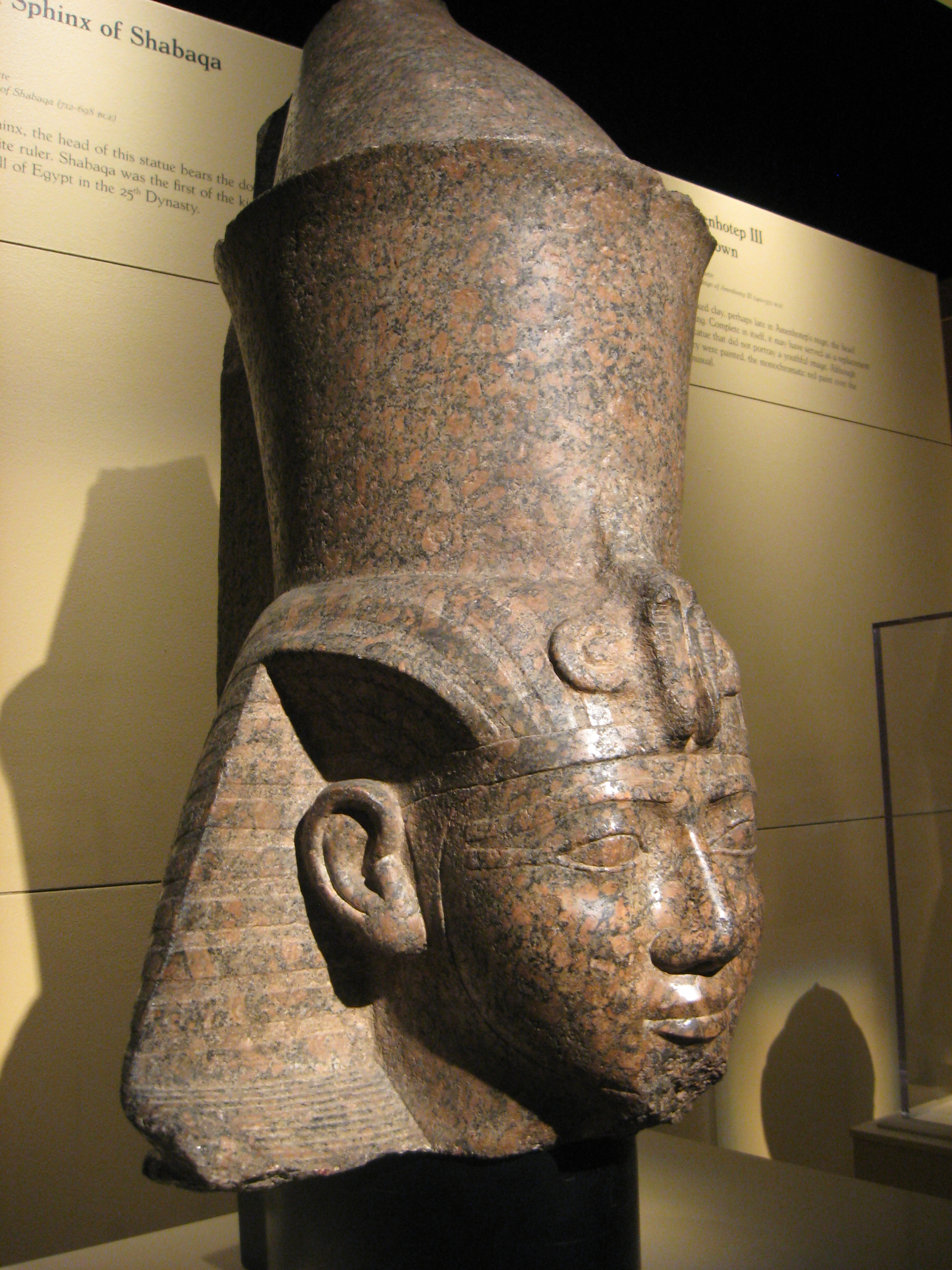
Shabaka

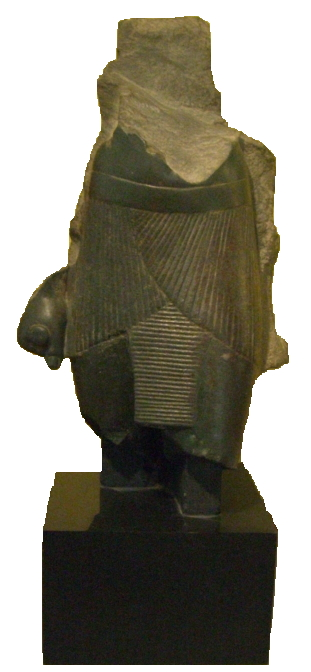
Statue of Shabaka from the Louvre

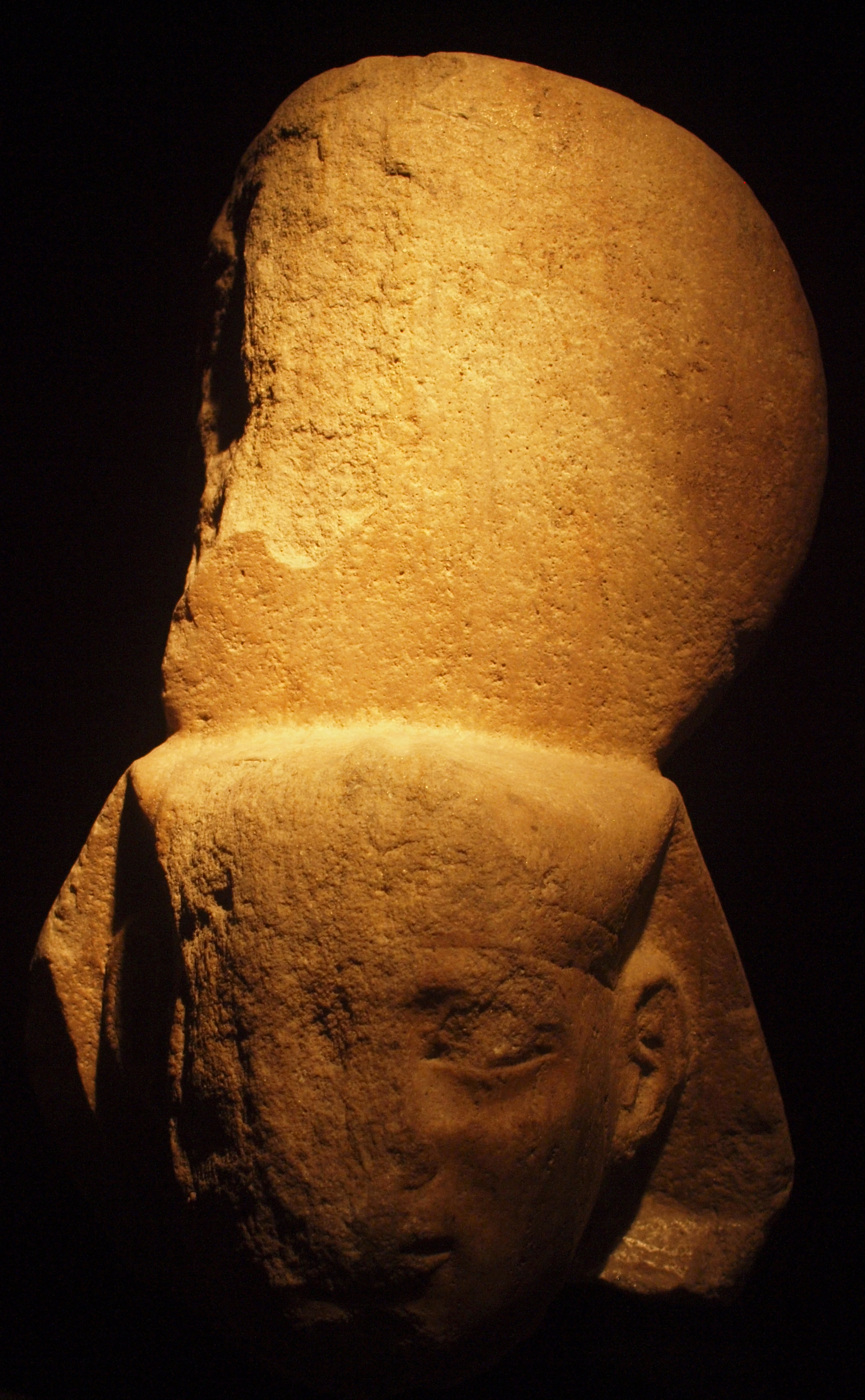
Statue head from Munich

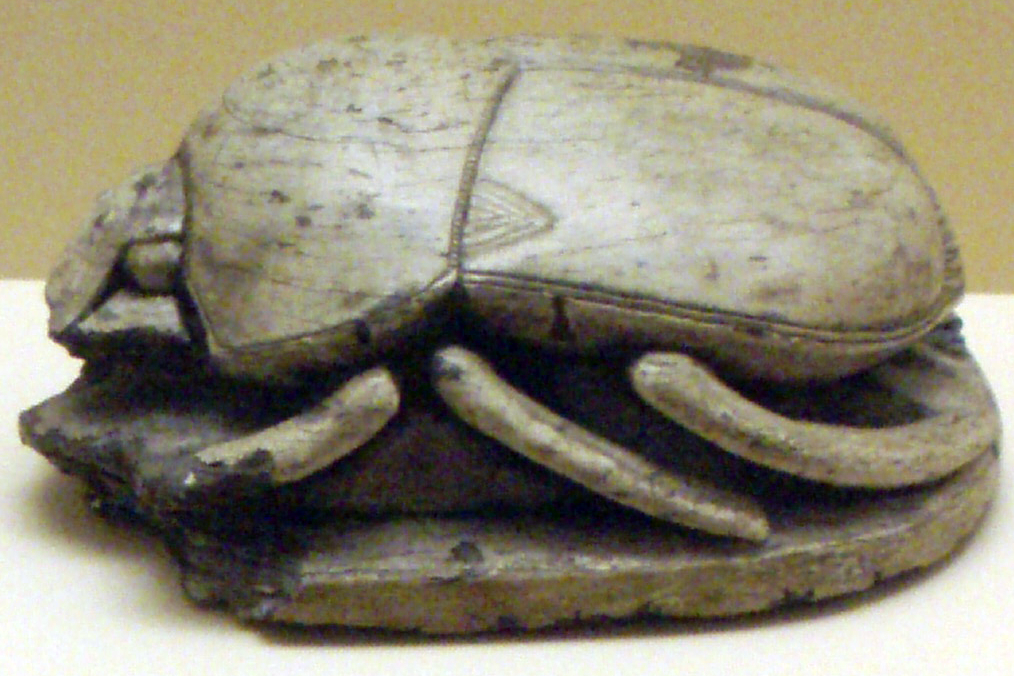
Large commemorative scarab of Shabaka

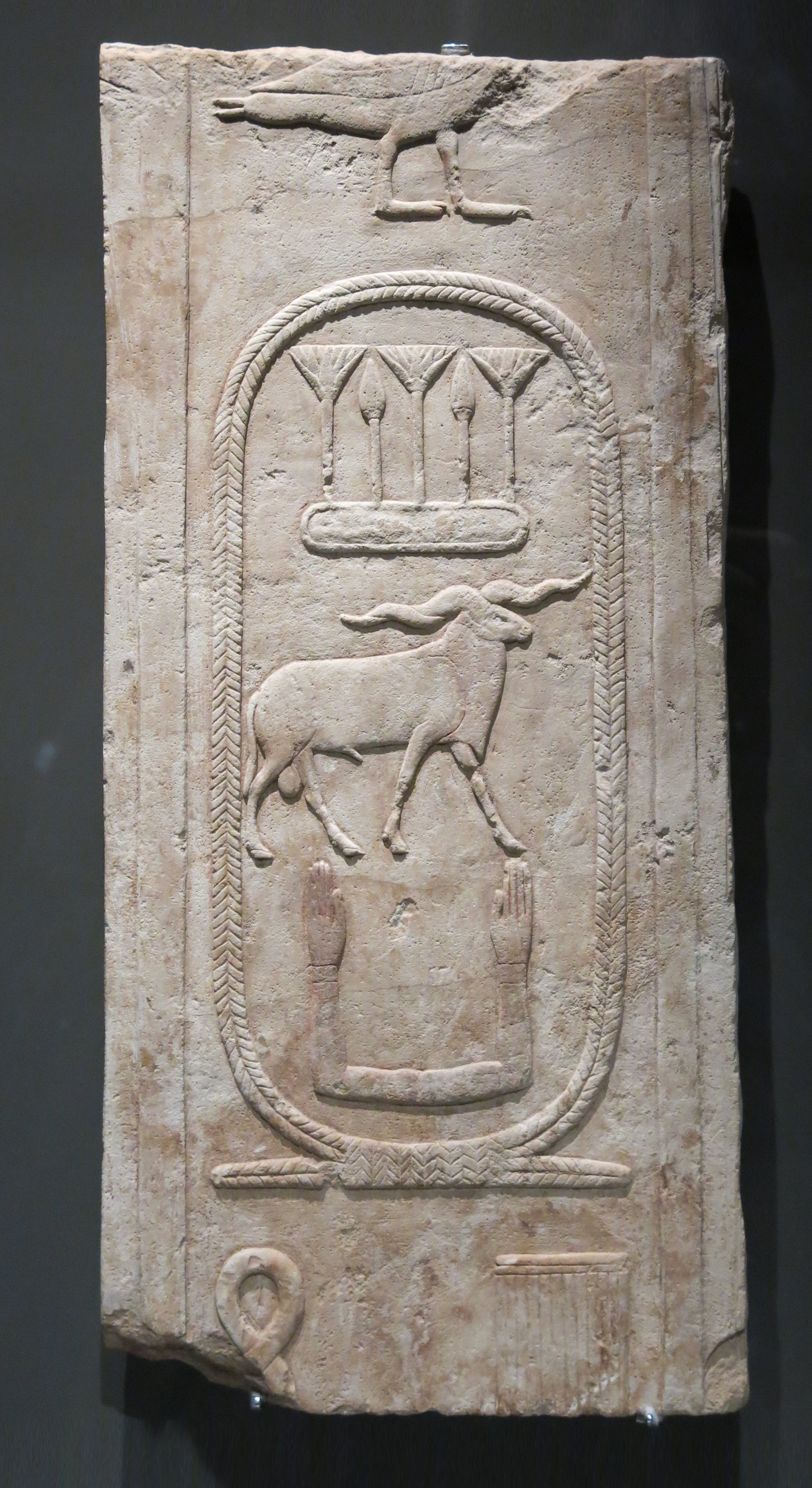
Cartouche with the name of pharaoh Shabaka

== Books and articles ==
- Baker, Heather D., ed., The Prosopography of the Neo-Assyrian Empire 3.2 Š-Z, Helsinki, 2011.
- Bányai, Michael, "Ein Vorschlag zur Chronologie der 25. Dynastie in Ägypten", Journal of Egyptian History 6 (2013) 46–129.
- Bányai, Michael, "Die Reihenfolge der kuschitischen Könige", Journal of Egyptian History 8 (2015) pp. 81–147.
- Hornung, Erich, Rolf Krauss & David Warburton, eds., Ancient Egyptian Chronology (Handbook of Oriental Studies), Leiden: Brill, 2006.
- Jurman, Claus, "The Order of the Kushite Kings According to Sources from the Eastern Desert and Thebes. Or: Shabataka was here first!, Journal of Egyptian History 10 (2017) 124-151.
- Kahn, Dan'el., Divided Kingdom, Co-regency, or Sole Rule in the Kingdom(s) of Egypt-and-Kush? Ägypten und Levante / Egypt and the Levant 16 (2006), pp. 275-291
- Kahn, Dan'el (2001). "The Inscription of Sargon II at Tang-i Var and the Chronology of Dynasty 25" (PDF). Orientalia. 70: 1–18. Archived from the original (PDF) on September 21, 2022.
- Kitchen, Kenneth A., The Third Intermediate Period in Egypt (1100–650 BC), 3rd edition, Warminster: Aris & Phillips, 1986.
- Morkot, Robert, The Black Pharaohs: Egypt's Nubian Rulers, The Rubicon Press, 2000. ISBN 0-948695-23-4.
- Payraudeau, Frédéric, "Retour sur la succession Shabaqo-Shabataqo," Nehet 1 (2014) 115–127.
- Redford, Donald, "A Note on the Chronology of Dynasty 25 and the Inscription of Sargon II at Tang-i Var," Orientalia 68 (1999) 58–60.
