= Pebatjma =

- Queen consort of Egypt
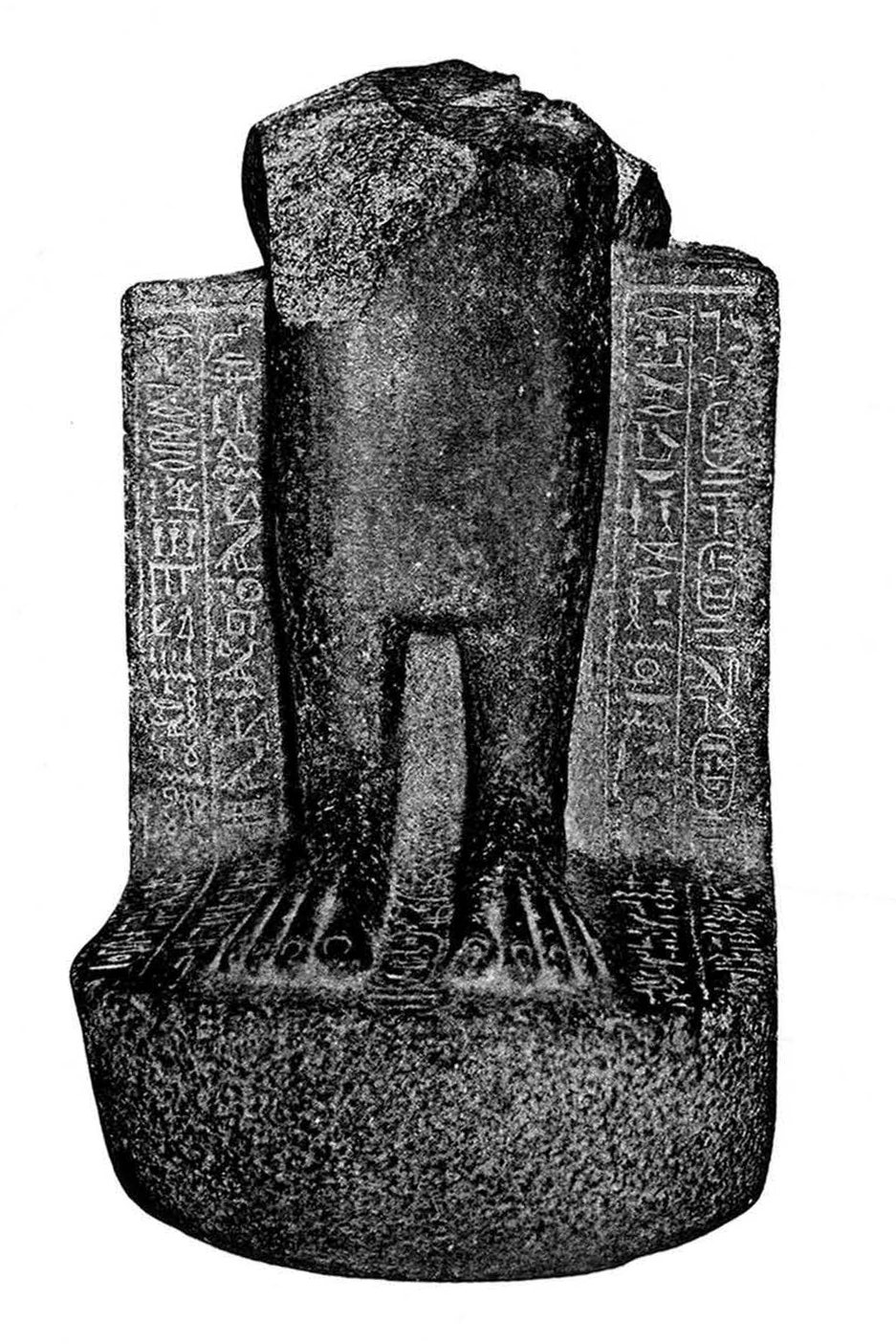
- Statue CG42198 of Amenardis I, bearing the cartouche of her mother Pebatjma between her feet
- Spouse: Pharaoh Kashta
- Issue: Piye?, Shabaka, Khensa?, Amenirdis I, Peksater, Neferukakashta?
Egyptian name
< p G29 T U1 >
- Dynasty: 25th Dynasty
- Religion: Ancient Egyptian religion

Pebatjma (or Pebatma) was a Nubian queen dated to the Twenty-fifth Dynasty of Egypt. She was the wife of King Kashta. She is mentioned on a statue of her daughter Amenirdis I, now in Cairo (42198). She is also mentioned on a doorjamb from Abydos.

== Family ==
Pebatjma was the wife of King Kashta. Several children and possible children are recorded:

- King Piye - Thought to be a son of Kashta and thus possibly a son of Pebatjma.
- King Shabaka - Mentioned as a brother of Amenirdis I, and hence a son of Kashta and Pebatjma.
- Queen Khensa - Wife of Piye, thought to be a daughter of Kashta and possibly Pebatjma.
- Queen Peksater (or Pekareslo) - She was married to Piye and was buried in Abydos. She may have died while accompanying Piye on a campaign to Egypt. Laming and Macadam suggest she was an adopted daughter of Pebatjma.
- God's Wife of Amun Amenirdis I. A statue of Amenirdis mentions she is the daughter of Kashta and Pebatjma.
- Neferukakashta - Thought to be a daughter of Kashta and possibly Pebatjma.

== Possible identification with Pabtamer ==
G40 U23 t b D41 N16 U7 A51
Pabtamer
(Pa-abt-ta-mer)
in hieroglyphs
Era: 3rd Intermediate Period
(1069–664 BC)

It is possible but by no means certain that Pebatjma is identical to a royal woman named Pabtamer (Pa-abt-ta-mer). A stela from Abydos belonging to a general named Paqattereru (Pekatror) records how this general was called upon by Osiris for the burial of his mother Pabtamer who had the beautiful name Meres-Nip ("beloved of Napata" or "She who loves Napata"). She holds the titles Chantress of Amun, King's Sister, King's daughter, and Mother of the Adorer of the God. It has been suggested that Pa-abt-ta-mer is an Egyptianization of the name Pebatjma. The problem with the identification is that Pa-abt-ta-mer holds slightly different titles than those recorded for Pebatjma on other monuments. Furthermore, the title of King's daughter is slightly problematic as there is no known king who could be her father. Paqattereru is not a King's son, and these facts may point to Pa-abt-ta-mer being an otherwise unknown wife of either Piye or Taharqa, and the mother of either Shepenupet II or Amenirdis II.
