= Bridge Software Institute =

Bridge engineering research organization

- Formation: 2000
- Type: Institute
- Headquarters: Gainesville, Florida
- Location: United States
- Director: Gary Consolazio, Ph.D.
- Key people: Michael Davidson, Ph.D., P.E. (Associate Director); Henry Bollmann, P.E. (Senior Engineer); Anand Patil, P.E. (Associate Director); Clinton Monari (Lead UI Developer); Cary Peterson (Licensing and Distribution)
- Website: Official website

The Bridge Software Institute is headquartered at the University of Florida (UF) in Gainesville, Florida. It was established in January 2000 to oversee the development of bridge related software products at UF. Today, Bridge Software Institute products are used by engineers nationwide, both in state Departments of Transportation and leading private consulting firms. Bridge Software Institute software is also used for the analysis of bridges in various countries by engineers around the world.

== Background ==
The institute is headquartered in Gainesville, Florida at the University of Florida. The Bridge Software Institute was officially established January 2000. The Bridge Software Institute develops bridge software used extensively in the transportation industry.

The software is engineered by leveraging the institutional research activities of the Structural/Geotechnical Research Groups in the Engineering School of Sustainable Infrastructure & Environment at the University of Florida. One of the main strengths of the institute, is in nonlinear dynamic finite element analysis and its applications to solving large-scale extreme event problems.

Since 2003, the Bridge Software Institute has developed a database system that integrates the application of geotechnical engineering data and associated metadata which enables the construction of services in the digital environment. The Florida Department of Transportation Database System is now being used in large-scale implementations, with more applications currently under development.

Bridge Software Institute also participates in the development and promotion of the Data Interchange for Geotechnical and GeoEnvironmental Specialists (DIGGS). DIGGS is a coalition of government agencies, universities and industry partners whose focus is on the creation and maintenance of an international data transfer standard for transportation related data. The coalition came into existence through coordination with the U.S. Federal Highway Administration who sponsored meetings and eventually formed the pooled fund study project.

== Products ==
=== FB-MultiPier ===
FB-MultiPier is a nonlinear finite element analysis program capable of analyzing multiple bridge pier structures interconnected by bridge spans. The full structure can be subjected to static analysis, AASHTO load analysis, response spectrum analysis, and time-history analysis. Each pier structure is composed of pier columns and cap supported on a pile cap and piles/shafts embedded in soil. This program couples nonlinear structural finite element analysis with nonlinear soil resistance models for axial, lateral, rotational, and torsional soil behavior to provide a robust system of analysis for coupled bridge pier structures and foundation systems. FB-MultiPier allows for finite element model generation based on graphical input and parametric descriptions of the structure and foundation systems. This allows the engineer to work directly with design parameters and improves efficiency in model creation and interpretation of analysis results.

=== FB-Deep ===
The FB-Deep computer program is a Windows-based program used to estimate the static axial capacity of drilled shafts and driven piles. The drilled shaft methodology is based upon Federal Highway Administration reports. Driven pile methodology utilizes two types of analyses: SPT and CPT. SPT methodology is based on empirical correlations between cone penetrometer tests and standard penetration tests for typical Florida soil types. Unit end bearing resistance and unit skin friction resistance versus SPT N values are given in the FDOT research bulletin RB-121, for the different soil types. Driven pile capacity calculated using CPT data can be determined by three separate methods. The first method is the Schmertmann method proposed by Schmertmann in 1978 (AASHTO LRFD Bridge Design Manual). The second method is the LCPC method proposed by Bustamante and Gianeselli for the French Highway Department in 1982. The third method is the UF method proposed by Bloomquist, McVay and Hu for the FDOT in 2007.

=== Pile Technician ===
Pile Technician was developed for the FDOT to provide a fast and efficient manner of entering Pile data to calculate payment for work performed by the contractor.

=== Atlas ===
ATLAS is an analysis/design program which is used for the analysis and design of signal lights and signs supported by the dual cable system. The analysis consists of an iterative technique which is a combination of the Force Density Method (FDM) and the Direct Stiffness Method (DSM). The FDM is ideal for the analysis of cable structures whereas the DSM is the most widely used technique for the analysis of framed structures. The nature of the structures under consideration lead to the development of this analysis technique which is a combination of the two methods. ATLAS handles the wind loading in a realistic manner. It allows the user to specify the wind speed as well as the areas of the signal lights or signs, parallel to the X and Y axis. In doing so the program calculates the applied loads on the corresponding nodal points internally, based on the specified element areas of the LIGHT elements in each plane. The loads are calculated in each cycle of the nonlinear process. Therefore, the applied loads in each cycle change with the rotation angle of the light. Thus the load are more realistic since they change with the swinging of the light. The angle change of the light also causes an uplift load at the cable nodal points.

== See also ==
- University of Florida
- University of Florida College of Engineering
