= Peksater =

- Queen consort of Nubia and Egypt; Great Royal Wife, King's Daughter, etc
- Burial: Cemetery D in Abydos
- Spouse: Pharaoh Piye
- Issue: unknown
Names
- Peksater or Pekerslo
- Dynasty: 25th Dynasty of Egypt
- Father: King Kashta
- Mother: Queen Pebatjma

p V31 Aa18 Z1 T r Z1
Peksater
in hieroglyphs
Era: 3rd Intermediate Period
(1069–664 BC)

Peksater (Pekerslo) was a Nubian queen dated to the Twenty-fifth Dynasty of Egypt.

== Biography ==
Peksater was the daughter of King Kashta and Queen Pebatjma. She appears with her husband Piye in a relief in the Amun Temple at Barkal. Piye is dressed as a high priest and officiates before the barque of Amun. Laming and Macadam suggest she was an adopted daughter of Pebatjma.

Peksater was buried in Abydos, Egypt. Parts of a lintel, three doorjambs and a stela were found. Here she is called king's daughter, king's wife and great king's wife.
