= Sunvära SK =

- City: Sunvära, Sweden
- League: Division 1
- Division: Västra
- Founded: 4 January 1943; 83 years ago
- Home arena: Sjöaremossen

Sunvära SK is a sports club in Sunvära, Sweden, established on 4 January 1943. The club runs bandy, and plays its home games on Sjöaremossen's artificial ice rink. The activity originally consisted of bandy, racewalking, skiing and track and field athletics. Since the 1950s the club only runs bandy.

The women's bandy team has played three seasons in the Swedish top division.
