= Piye =

Ancient Kushite king and pharaoh

- Pānkhi, Piankhy, Piānkhi, Paiānkhi, Paānkhi
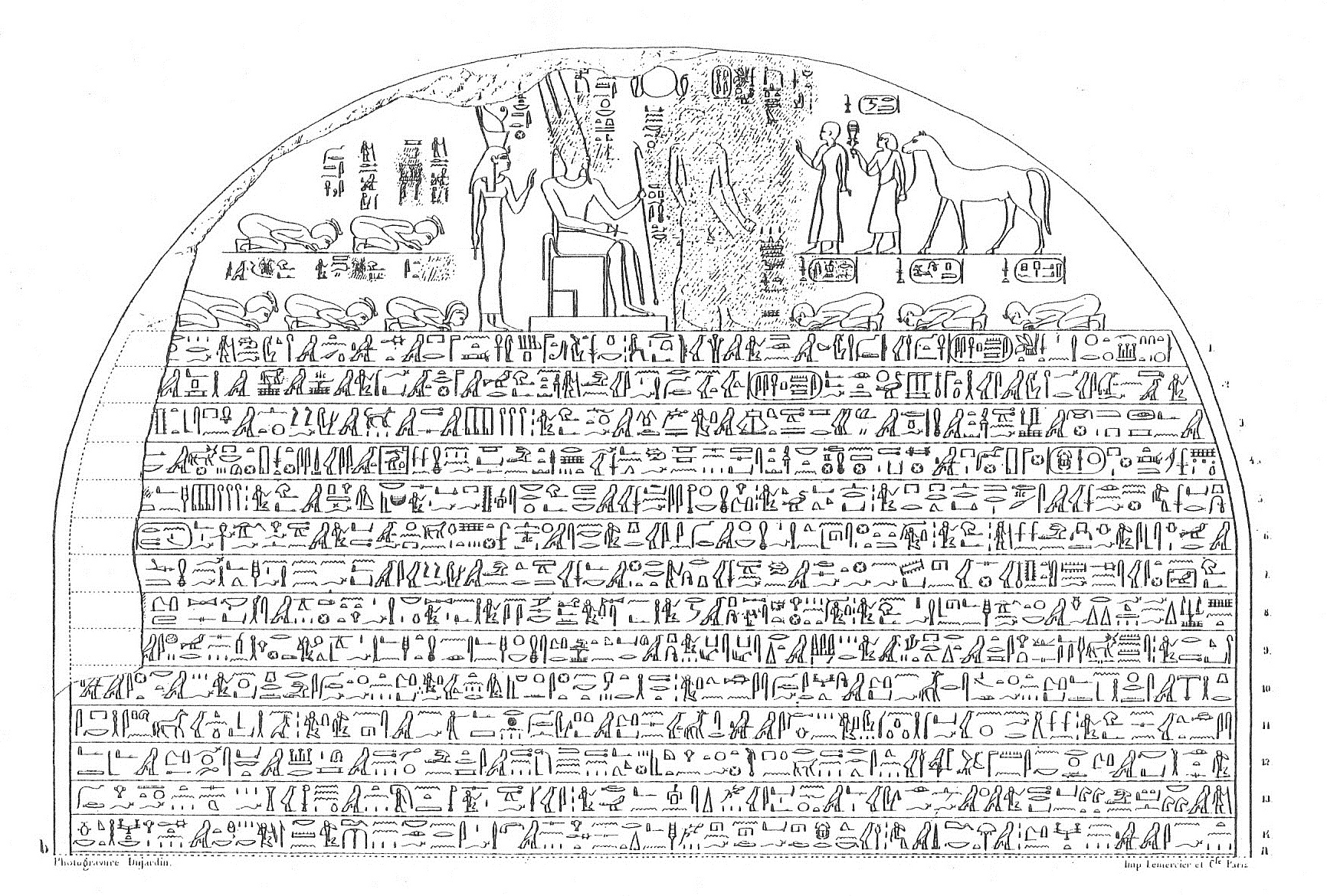
- Drawing of the upper part of the Stele of Piye. The lunette on the top depicts Piye being tributed by various Lower Egypt rulers, and the text describes his successful invasion of Egypt. While the stele itself dates back to Piye's reign in the Twenty-fifth Dynasty, it also describes events from the Twenty-third Dynasty.

Pharaoh
- Reign: 744–714 BC
- Predecessor: Kashta
- Successor: Shebitku
Royal titulary
Horus name
Zematawy
Nebty name
Mes-hemut
Golden Horus
Sasha-qenu
Prenomen
Usimare

M23 X1 L2 X1	ra F12 mA mAa t
Nomen
Piy

G39 N5	p S34 i i
- Consorts: Tabiry, Abar, Khensa, Peksater
- Children: Shebitku; Taharqa; Shepenupet II; Qalhata; Arty; Tabekenamun; Naparaye; Takahatenamun; Har; Khaliut
- Father: Kashta
- Mother: possibly Pebatjma
- Burial: El-Kurru
- Monuments: Stelae at Jebel Barkal, enlargement of Temple of Amun, Jebel Barkal, Pyramid at El-Kurru
- Dynasty: 25th Dynasty

Piye (also interpreted as Pānkhi, Piankhy, Paiānkhi, Piānkhi, or Paānkhi) (Note: The complete nomen is always written with an ankh hieroglyph (𓋹 "life, live"), once presumed a phonemic part of the name, but now thought to be an unpronounced determinative or an inserted honorific, cf. ankh wedja seneb.) was an ancient Kushite king and founder of the Twenty-fifth Dynasty of Egypt, who ruled Egypt during 744–714 BC. He ruled from the city of Napata, located deep in Nubia, modern-day Sudan.

== Name ==
Piye adopted two throne names: Usimare and Sneferre. He was passionate about the worship of the god Amun, like many kings of Nubia. He revitalized the moribund Great Temple of Amun at Jebel Barkal, which was first built under Thutmose III of the New Kingdom, employing numerous sculptors and stonemasons from Egypt. He was once thought to have also used the throne name 'Menkheperre' ("the Manifestation of Ra abides") but this praenomen has now been recognized as belonging to a local Theban king named Ini instead who was a contemporary of Piye.

== Family ==
Piye was the son of Kashta and Pebatjma. He is known to have had three or four wives. Abar was the mother of his successor Taharqa. Further wives are Tabiry, Peksater and probably Khensa.

Piye is known to have had several children. He was the father of:

- King Shebitku. Said to be a son of Piye, or alternatively a brother of Piye.
- King Taharqa. Son of Queen Abar. He would take the throne after his uncle Shabaka and another male relative Shebitku.
- God's Wife of Amun Shepenwepet II. Installed in Thebes during the reign of her brother Taharqa.
- Qalhata, wife of King Shabaka, she was the mother of king Tanutamun and probably of King Shabataka as well.
- Tabekenamun married her brother Taharqa.
- Naparaye married her brother Taharqa.
- Takahatenamun married her brother Taharqa.
- Arty, married king Shebitku.
- Har. Known from an offering table of his daughter Wadjrenes from Thebes (TT34).
- Khaliut, Governor of Kanad according to a stela found at Barkal.
- Princess Mutirdis, Chief Prophet of Hathor and Mut in Thebes and daughter of Piye according to Morkot. Thought to be a daughter of a local ruler named Menkheperre Khmuny from Hermopolis by Kitchen.

== Conquest of Egypt ==
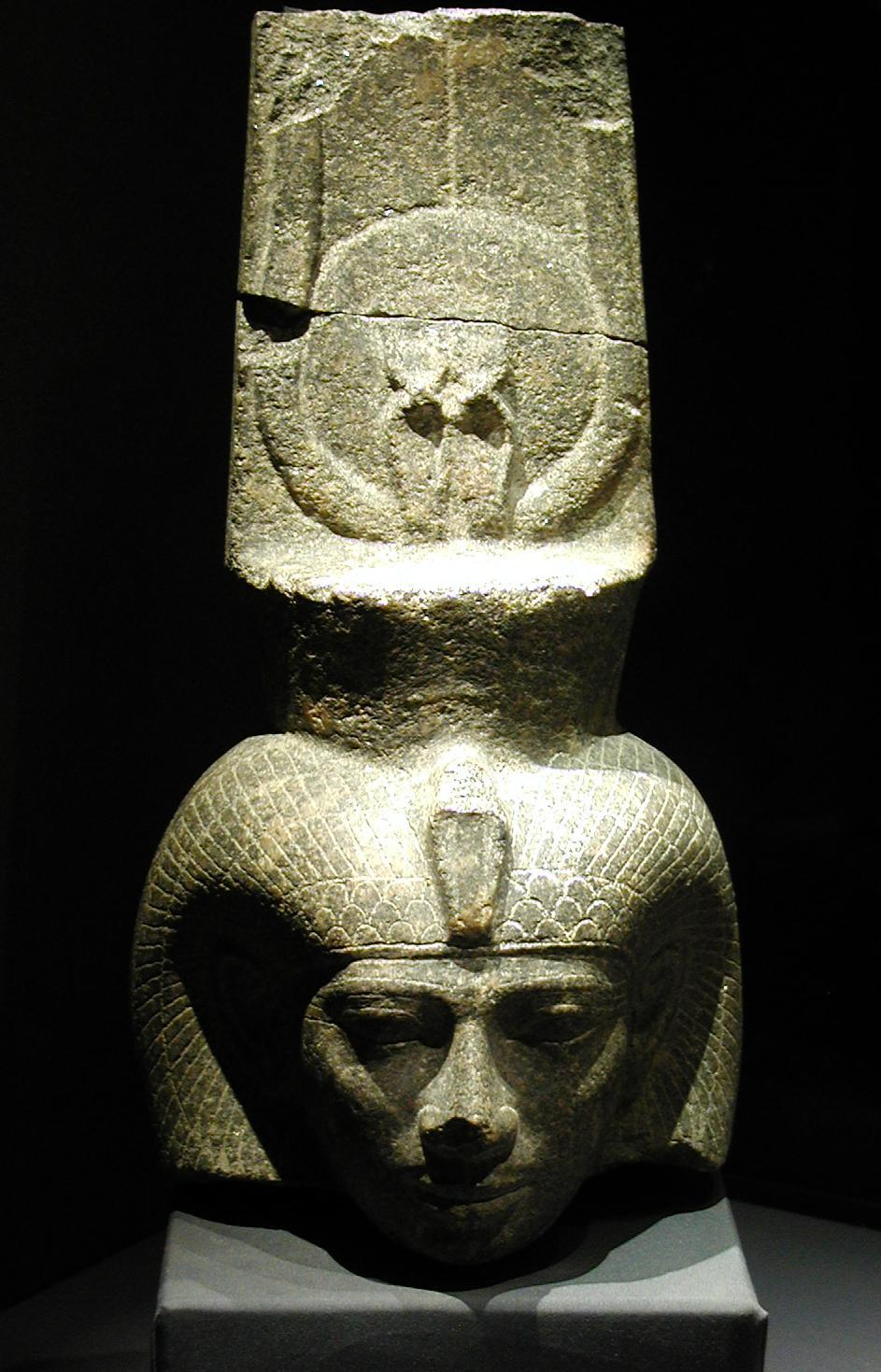
Image of Shepenupet II, "Divine adoratrice of Amón" and daughter of Piye

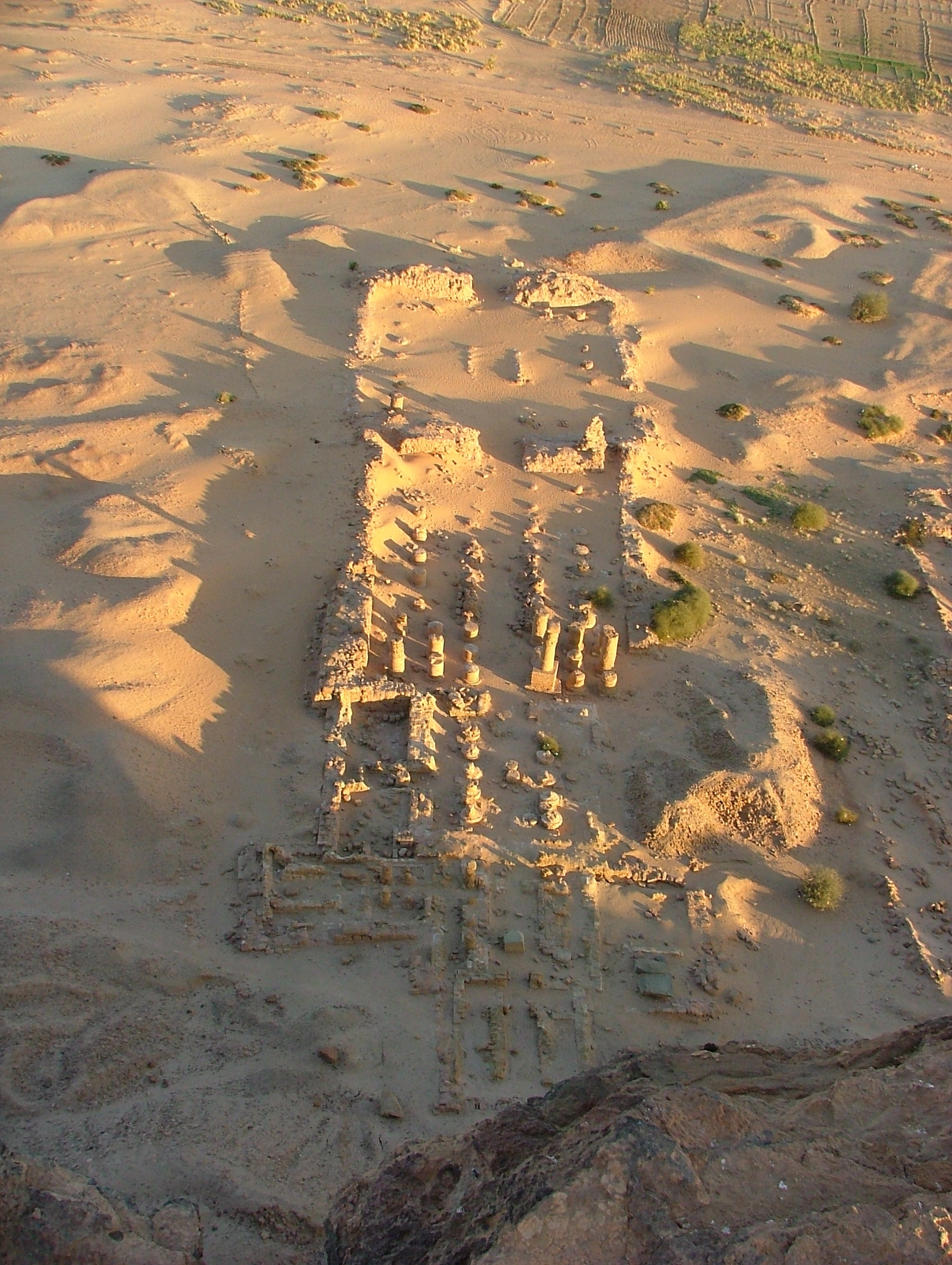
Ruins of the Temple of Gebel Barkal

As ruler of Nubia and Upper Egypt, Piye took advantage of the squabbling of Egypt's rulers by expanding Nubia's power beyond Thebes into Lower Egypt. In reaction to this, Tefnakht of Sais formed a coalition between the local kings of the Delta Region and enticed Piye's nominal ally—king Nimlot of Hermopolis—to defect to his side. Tefnakht then sent his coalition army south and besieged Herakleopolis where its king Peftjauawybast and the local Nubian commanders appealed to Piye for help. Piye reacted quickly to this crisis in his regnal year 20 by assembling an army to invade Middle and Lower Egypt and visited Thebes in time for the great Opet Festival which proves he effectively controlled Upper Egypt by this time. His military feats are chronicled in the Victory stela at Gebel Barkal:

Hear what I have done in exceeding the ancestors. I am the king, the representation of god, the living image of Atum, who issued from the womb marked as ruler, who is feared by those greater than he, [whose father] knew and whose mother perceived even in the egg that he would be ruler, the good god, beloved of the gods, the Son of Re, who acts with his two arms, Piye, beloved of Amon ....

— Victory Stele of Piye.

Piye viewed his campaign as a holy war, commanding his soldiers to cleanse themselves ritually before beginning battle. He himself offered sacrifices to the great god Amun.

Piye then marched north and achieved complete victory at Herakleopolis, conquering the cities of Hermopolis and Memphis among others, and received the submission of the kings of the Nile Delta including Iuput II of Leontopolis, Osorkon IV of Tanis and his former ally Nimlot at Hermopolis. Hermopolis fell to the Nubian king after a siege lasting five months. Tefnakht took refuge in an island in the Delta and formally conceded defeat in a letter to the Nubian king but refused to personally pay homage to the Kushite ruler. Satisfied with his triumph, Piye proceeded to sail south to Thebes and returned to his homeland in Nubia never to return to Egypt.

Despite Piye's successful campaign into the Delta, his authority only extended northward from Thebes up to the western desert oases and Herakleopolis where Peftjauawybast ruled as a Nubian vassal king. The local kings of Lower Egypt—especially Tefnakht—were essentially free to do what they wanted without Piye's oversight. It was Shebitku, Piye's successor, who later rectified this unsatisfactory situation by attacking Sais and defeating Tefnakht's successor Bakenranef there, in his second regnal year.

== Length of reign ==
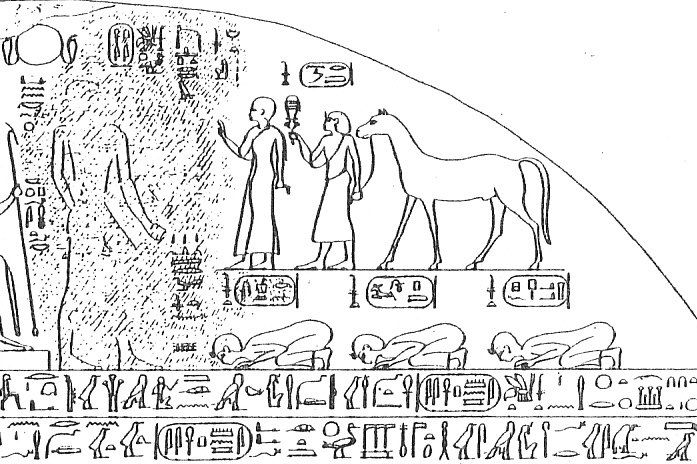
Detail of a drawing of the Victory stele: Piye (left, partially erased) is tributed by four Nile Delta rulers: Nimlot standing, and kneeling from left to right, Osorkon (IV), Iuput (II) and Peftjauawybast.

Piye's highest known date was long thought to be the "Year 24 III Akhet day 10" date mentioned in the "Smaller Dakhla Stela" (Ashmolean Museum No.1894) from the Sutekh temple of Mut el-Kharab in the Dakhla Oasis. However, reliefs from the Great Temple at Gebel Barkal depict Piye celebrating a Heb Sed Festival. Such festivals were traditionally celebrated in a king's 30th Year. It is debated whether the reliefs portrayed historical events, or were prepared in advance for the festival—in which case Piye might have died before his 30th regnal year. Piye is also attested by two papyri dated to Year 21 and 22 of his reign where he is named Pharaoh "Piye Si-Ese Meryamun" which is undoubtedly this king's name.

Kenneth Kitchen has suggested a reign of 31 years for Piye, based on the Year 8 donation stela of a king Shepsesre Tefnakht who is commonly viewed as Piye's opponent. A dissenting opinion came from Olivier Perdu in 2002, who believes that this stela refers instead to the later king Tefnakht II because of stylistic similarities to another, dated to Year 2 of Necho I's reign. Secondly, Kitchen observes that:

A fragmentary bandage from Western Thebes bears an obscure date of Sneferre Piankhy [or Piye]. The visible traces indicate 'Regnal Year 20', a patch and trace (the latter compatible with a '10'), and a shallow sign perhaps an otiose t. In other words, we here have a date higher than Year 20 of Piankhy [or Piye], and very possibly Year 30—which would fit very well with the 31 years' minimum reign which has been already inferred on independent grounds.

== Burial ==
Piye's tomb was located next to the largest Pyramid in the cemetery, designated Ku.1 (seen in the image on the right), at el-Kurru near Jebel Barkal in what is now Northern Sudan. Down a stairway of 19 steps opened to the east, the burial chamber is cut into the bedrock as an open trench and covered with a corbelled masonry roof. His body had been placed on a bed which rested in the middle of the chamber on a stone bench with its four corners cut away to receive the legs of the bed so that the bed platform lay directly on the bench. Further out to the edge of the cemetery (the first pharaoh to receive such an entombment in more than 500 years) his four favorite horses had been buried. This site would be also occupied by the tombs of several later members of the dynasty.

== Bibliography ==
- Roberto B. Gozzoli: The Writing of History in Ancient Egypt during the First Millennium BC (ca. 1070-180 BC), Trends and Perspectives, London 2006, S. 54-67 ISBN 0-9550256-3-X
