= Victory Stela of Kalabsha =

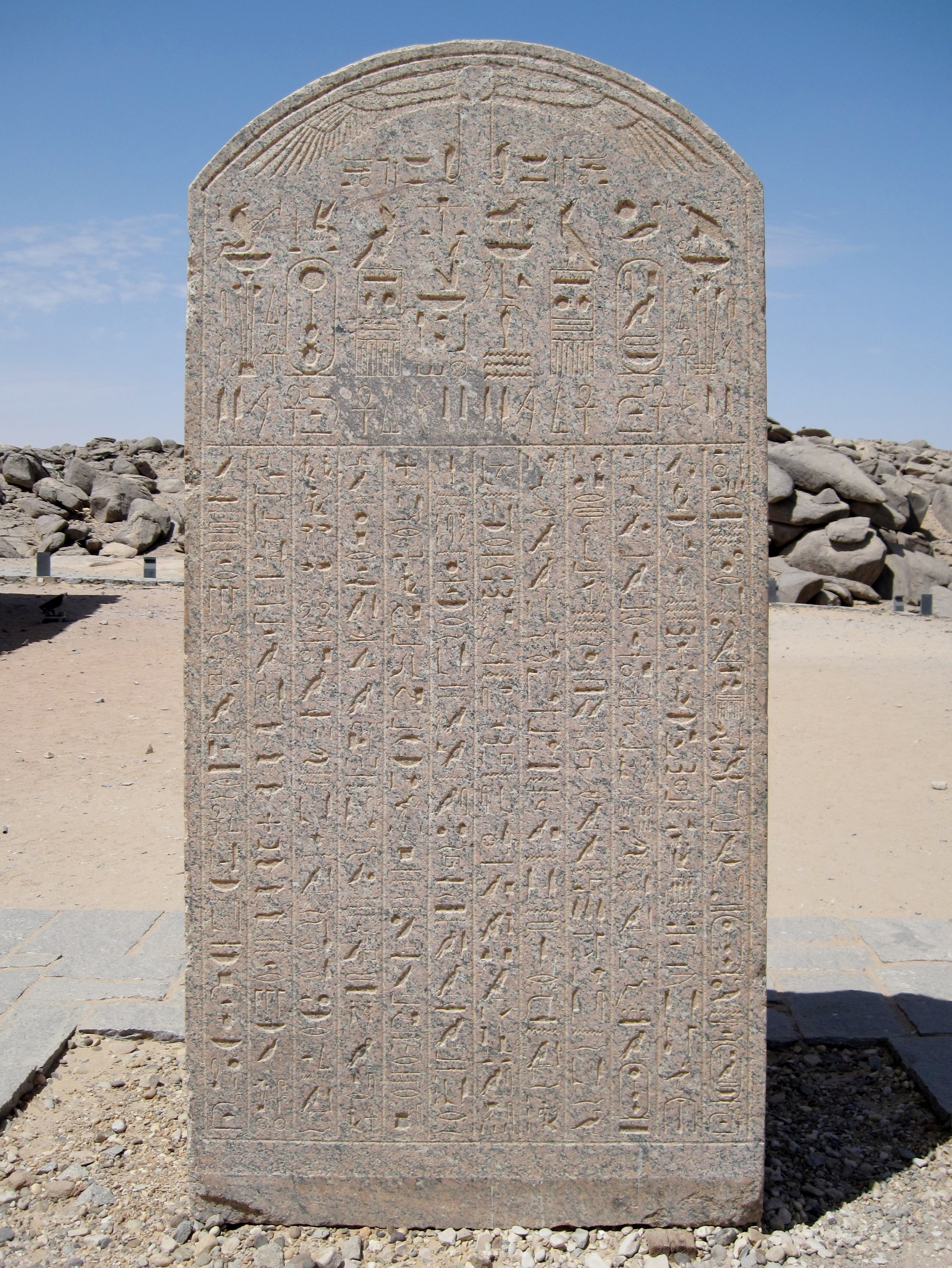
Kalabsha Stele of Psammetichus II.

Victory Stela of Kalabsha, also known as the Shellal Stele, is an ancient Egyptian stele made of red granite with a hieroglyphic inscription dating back to Psammetichus II, the third pharaoh of the 26th Dynasty. It originates from a quarry south of Aswan, near a former port town now submerged in Lake Nasser. Discovered on western shore of the Nile in 1964, the stele now stands at the Mandulis Temple (Temple of Kalabsha), which was relocated to New Kalabsha Island in Lake Nasser.

== Description ==
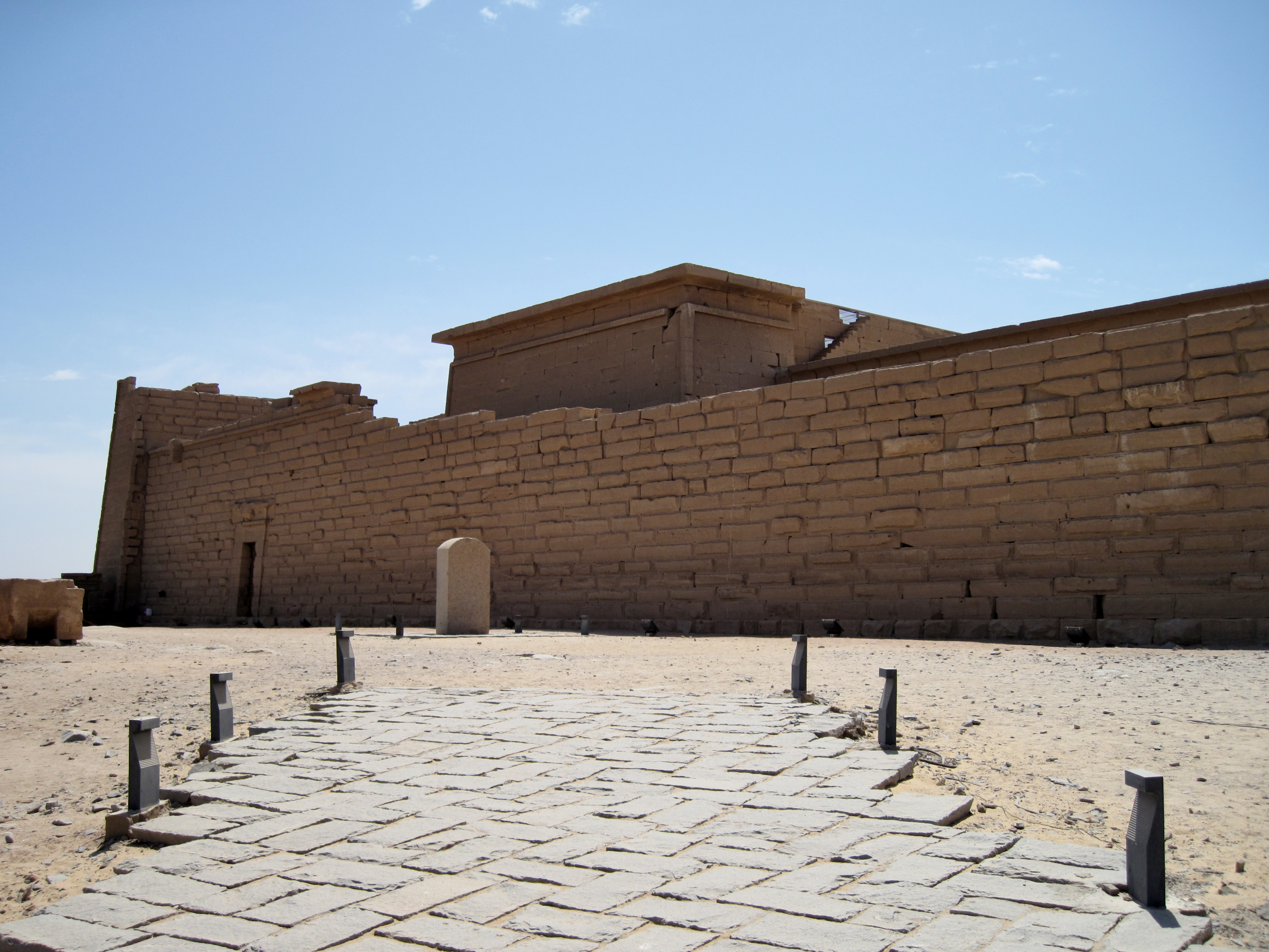
Current location of the stelae next to the Mandulis Temple on New Kalabsha

A part of a similar stele had already been sketched by Richard Lepsius at a small temple near Philae during the Royal Prussian Expedition to Egypt and Ethiopia from 1842 to 1845. Lepsius published it in Volume VIII of his catalogue of monuments from Egypt and Ethiopia. The hieroglyphic inscription on that stele fragment is almost identical to that of the upper part of the Kalabsha Stele that was discovered in 1964.

In the eight columns of both inscriptions, the king's cartouches are listed with his throne name Nefer-ib-Re (Nfr-jb-Rˁ) and his personal name Psammetichus (Psmṯk) in columns 2 and 7. The translation of the upper part of the Shellal Stele, from left to right, is,

Beloved by Wadjet, who grants life, health, and dominion. King of Upper and Lower Egypt, Nefer-ib-Re, may he live forever. Horus Menech-ib-Re, who grants life. Beloved by Satis, Lady of Elephantine. Beloved by Khnum, Lord of the Cataracts. Horus Menech-ib-Re, who grants life. Son of Re, Psammetichus, may he live forever. Beloved by Nekhbet, who grants life, health, and dominion.

The rest of the text on the Shellal Stele describes the last military campaign of an ancient Egyptian king to the south. Unlike the two other texts describing Psammetichus II's campaign into Nubia, the Karnak and Tanis Steles, the inscription on the Kalabsha Stele is completely preserved.

The lack of determinatives in the hieroglyphic text allows for considerable leeway in translation. The inscription is divided into 12 columns, which are to be read from right to left. Right at the beginning of the text, the third year of the king's reign is given as the date of the campaign, which, according to current understanding, would correspond to the year 593 BC. The stele is believed to have been erected on the then southern border of the pharaoh's kingdom against the Kingdom of Kush.

The eighth column begins with the king's decision to lead his troops in Nubia himself. It describes how, upon Psammetichus's arrival, the rebels fled without engaging in battle or raising their weapons against the king. According to the ninth and tenth columns, 4,200 Nubians were taken prisoner. After the successful outcome of the battle, Psammetichus had a large number of short- and long-horned cattle sacrificed to the gods of Upper and Lower Egypt, and one to the gods of the palace guard, in order, as the twelfth column states, to ensure stability, power, health, and happiness for all forever.

=== Return journey ===
Following the military victory in favor of the Egyptians near the Third Cataract at Kerma, Psammetichus II began his return journey. His army advanced further south, where, according to the Tanis Stele, they captured and destroyed the royal capital of the Kushite kingdom, most likely Napata. The names of the Egyptian commanders are known from a Greek inscription on the colossal seated statue of Ramses II south of the entrance to the rock temple at Abu Simbel. The native Egyptians were commanded by Amasis, who would later become pharaoh himself, and the foreign-speaking mercenaries by Potasimto. The campaign ended at the Fourth Cataract, which was impassable for ships. It remains unclear why, after the conclusion of hostilities, Nubia was not incorporated into the Egyptian empire, but rather Egypt's southern border continued to run along the First Cataract south of Elephantine Island near the Temple of Philae.

== Karnak stela of Psamtik II ==
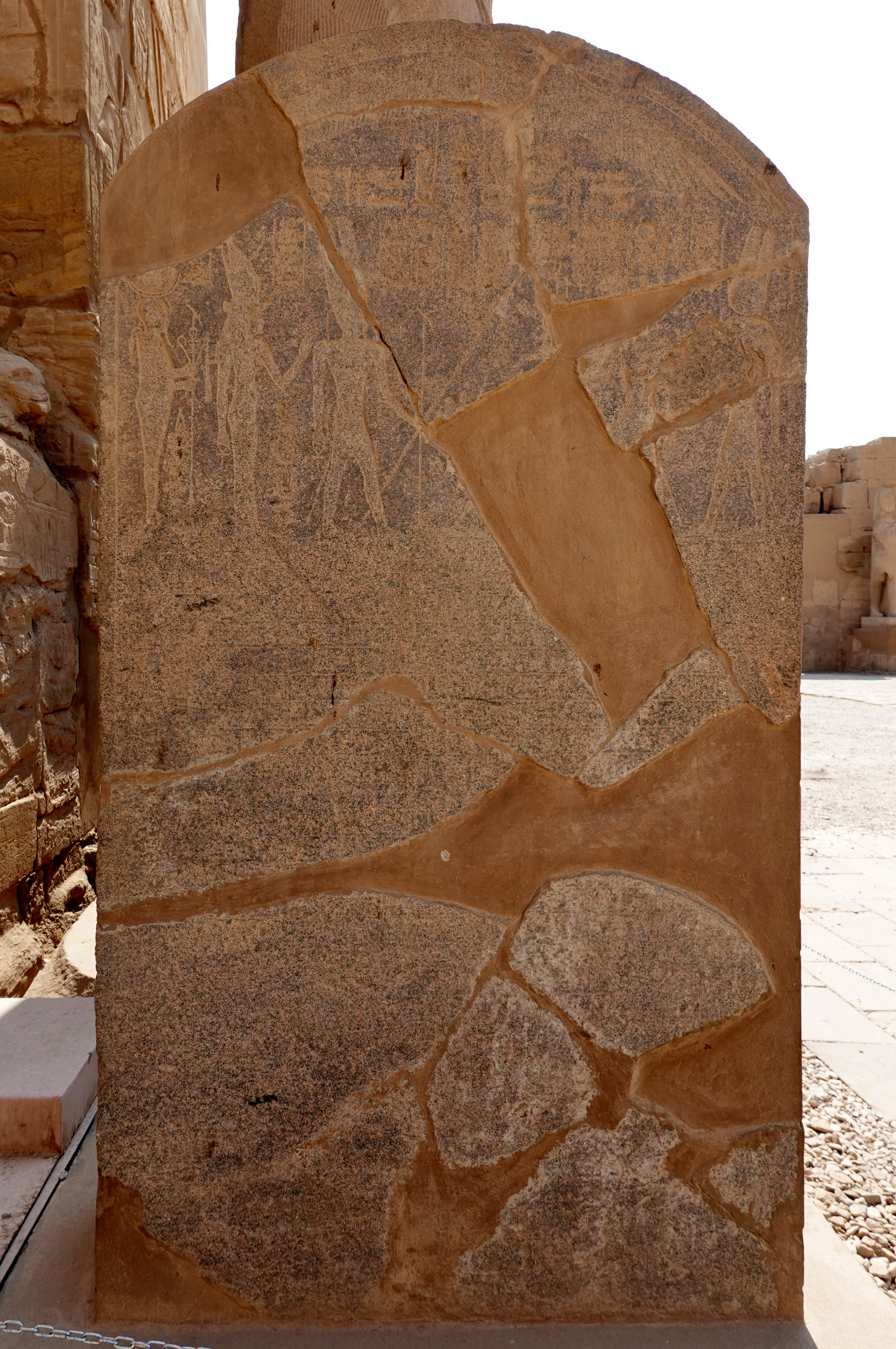
Another stela of the Nubian campaign of Psammetichus II: fragmented stela at Karnak

Another red granite stela of Psamtik II referring to his Nubian campaign was discovered broken in pieces by Georges Legrain at the Karnak Temple already in 1905. It was found at the northwest of the fore-gate of the Second Pylon near its original base. Its original height was 1.80m. Only parts of it could be read at the time.

The third similar stela, also broken up, was discovered in Tanis in 1937. All three of these stelas have a similar inscription.

== See also ==
- New Kalabsha
- Temple of Kalabsha
- Twenty-sixth Dynasty of Egypt family tree

== Bibliography ==
- Joachim Willeitner (2012), "Die Schellal-Stele", [(first 8 pages) - archive.org Abu Simbel und die Tempel des Nassersees. Der archäologische Führer] (PDF), Darmstadt, Mainz: von Zabern, pp. 35–37, ISBN 978-3-8053-4457-9
