= Nitocris (disambiguation) =

Nitocris ordinarily refers to a supposed queen of the Egyptian 6th Dynasty, see Nitocris.

The name may also denote:

- Nitocris I (Divine Adoratrice), a God's Wife of Amun during the 26th Dynasty
- Nitocris II, a female High Priest of Amun
- Nitocris of Babylon, an otherwise unknown queen regnant of Babylon described by Herodotus
- Nitocris (band), a band, and their self-titled album Nitocris
- Nitocris, a synonym of the moth genus Proteuxoa in the family Noctuidae
