= Khedebneithirbinet I =

Queen consort of Ancient Egypt

Khedebneithirbinet I in hieroglyphs
sw t n N42 t sw n mwt < R24 X d b ir b n t >
- King's wife and King's mother
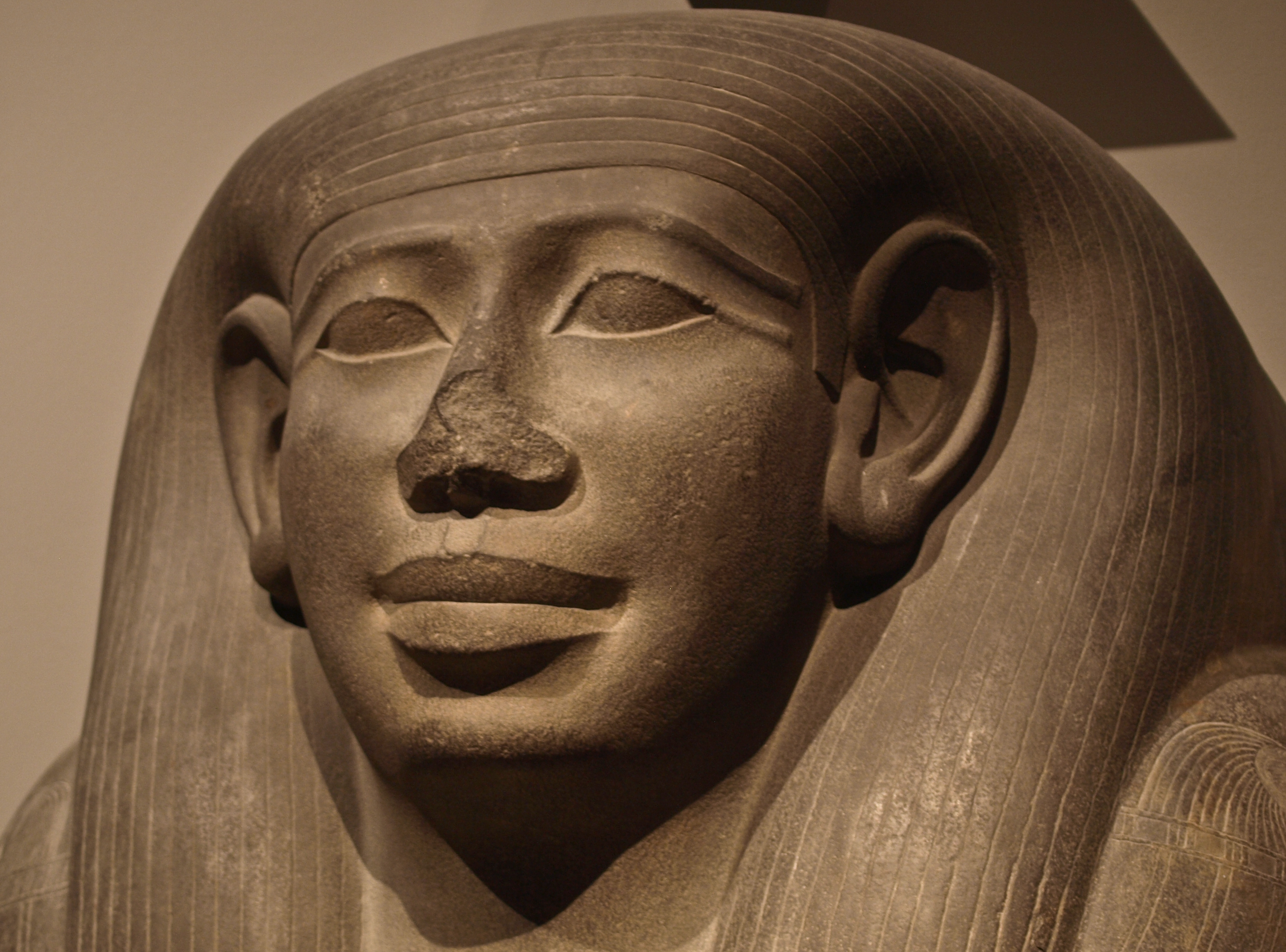
- Close-up of the stone sarcophagus lid of Queen Khedebneithirbinet I in the Kunsthistorisches Museum, Vienna.

Khedebneithirbinet I ("Neith kills the evil eye") was an ancient Egyptian queen from the 26th Dynasty, probably the wife of pharaoh Necho II and the mother of his successor, Psamtik II.

== Biography ==
The identification as Necho's wife is solely based on the fact that her sarcophagus dates to the 26th Dynasty, that her titles as King's wife and King's mother fit, and that no other wife is attested for the king. Her stone sarcophagus lid (ÄS3), now located in the Kunsthistorisches Museum in Vienna, was discovered in 1807 and indicates that she was probably buried at Sebennytos in Lower Egypt if the provenance given for this object is correct.
