= Takhuit =

Ancient Egyptian queen consort

t A Aa1 w t
Takhuit
in hieroglyphs
Era: Late Period
(664–332 BC)

Takhuit was the Great Royal Wife of Psamtik II. She dates to the Twenty-sixth Dynasty of Egypt.

She was the wife of Psamtik II and the mother of Pharaoh Apries and the God's Wife of Amun Ankhnesneferibre. Takhuit is known to be the wife of King Psamtik II, because their daughter Ankhnesneferibre is recorded as a King's Sister and to be born of Takhuit.

== Burial ==
Takhuit was buried in Athribis. Her tomb was discovered in 1950. A large sarcophagus and a heart scarab were discovered in her tomb.
