= Amasis =

Amasis may refer to:

== People ==
- Amasis I, Pharaoh of Egypt (1550–1525 BC)
- Amasis II, Pharaoh of Egypt (570–526 BC)
- Amasis Painter (fl. 550–510 BC), ancient Greek vase painter who gets his name from the signature of the potter below
- Amasis (potter) (fl. 560/550–530/520 BC), ancient Greek potter who worked with the painter
- Amasis (Persian general) (fl. 550–500 BC), Achaemenid military commander in Egypt
- Amasis (wrestler), American professional wrestler

== Other uses ==
- Amasis Apartments, an Egyptian Revival apartment building in Los Angeles, California
- the title character of Amasis, King of Egypt, a 1738 tragic play
- Amasis, a type font created by Ron Carpenter (designer)
