= Potasimto =

Ancient Egyptian general

Potasimto (Ancient Egyptian: pḏj-zmꜣ-tꜣwj; Ancient Greek: Ποτασιμτο Potasimto; fl. 592 BCE) was an ancient Egyptian general during the 26th Dynasty.

p D37	M127	zmA wAD

Padisematawi
Pḏj-zmꜣ-tꜣwj
in hieroglyphs
Era: Late Period
(664–332 BC)

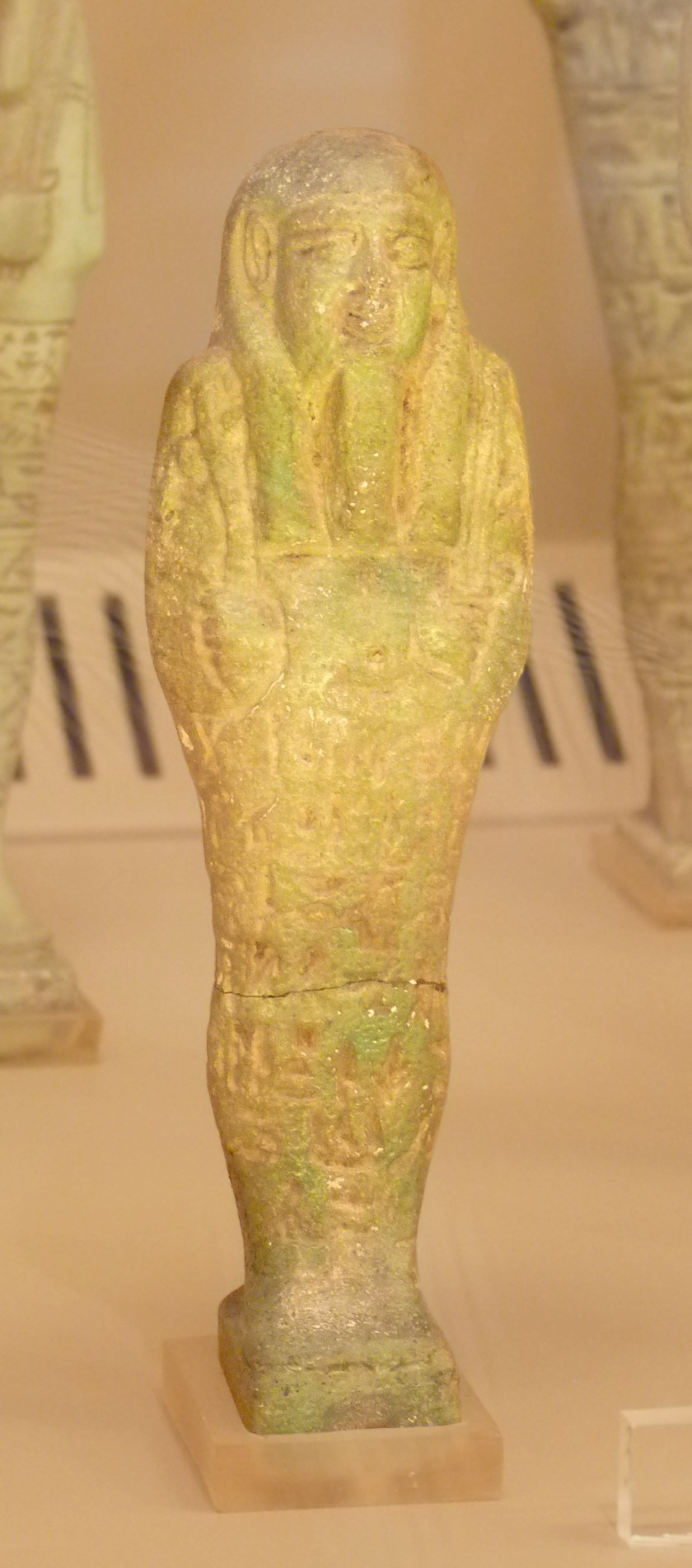
Faience ushabti of Potasimto. Bologna, MCA.

== Biography ==
Born in Pharbaetus, he was the commander of the Greek and Carian troops which were sent by pharaoh Psamtik II, along with Egyptian troops, in the military expedition against Nubia in 592 BCE. The name Potasimto was given to him by those foreign soldiers and is indeed a Hellenization of the Egyptian name Pḏj-zmꜣ-tꜣwj (or Padisematawy). The hellenized form of the name came from a well-known Greek graffito which was scratched by his troops on the left leg of the colossal seated statue of Ramesses II in Abu Simbel:

When King Psammetichus came to Elephantine, this was written by those who sailed with Psammetichus the son of Theocles, and they came beyond Kerkis as far as the river permits. Those who spoke foreign tongues were led by Potasimto, the Egyptians by Amasis.

Potasimto died some time after the successful campaign, and was probably buried in Kom Abu Yassin (the necropolis of Pharbaetus) as evidenced by his monuments. These include a stone sarcophagus and a stone vessel now both at the Cairo Museum, three ushabti (Limoges, Annecy and Bologna), a statue of his father Raemmaakheru and a stela of his brother.
