= Nitocris II =

6th century BC Egyptian princess, High Priest of Amun

- High Priestess of Amun in Thebes; Divine Adoratrice of Amun?
Egyptian name
R8 U36 D1 t n i mn n R24 t i N29 r t
hm-ntr [tpy] n-'Imn, Nt-jqrt
High Priestess of Amun, Nitocris
- Dynasty: 26th Dynasty
- Pharaoh: Amasis II, Psamtik III
- Father: Amasis II

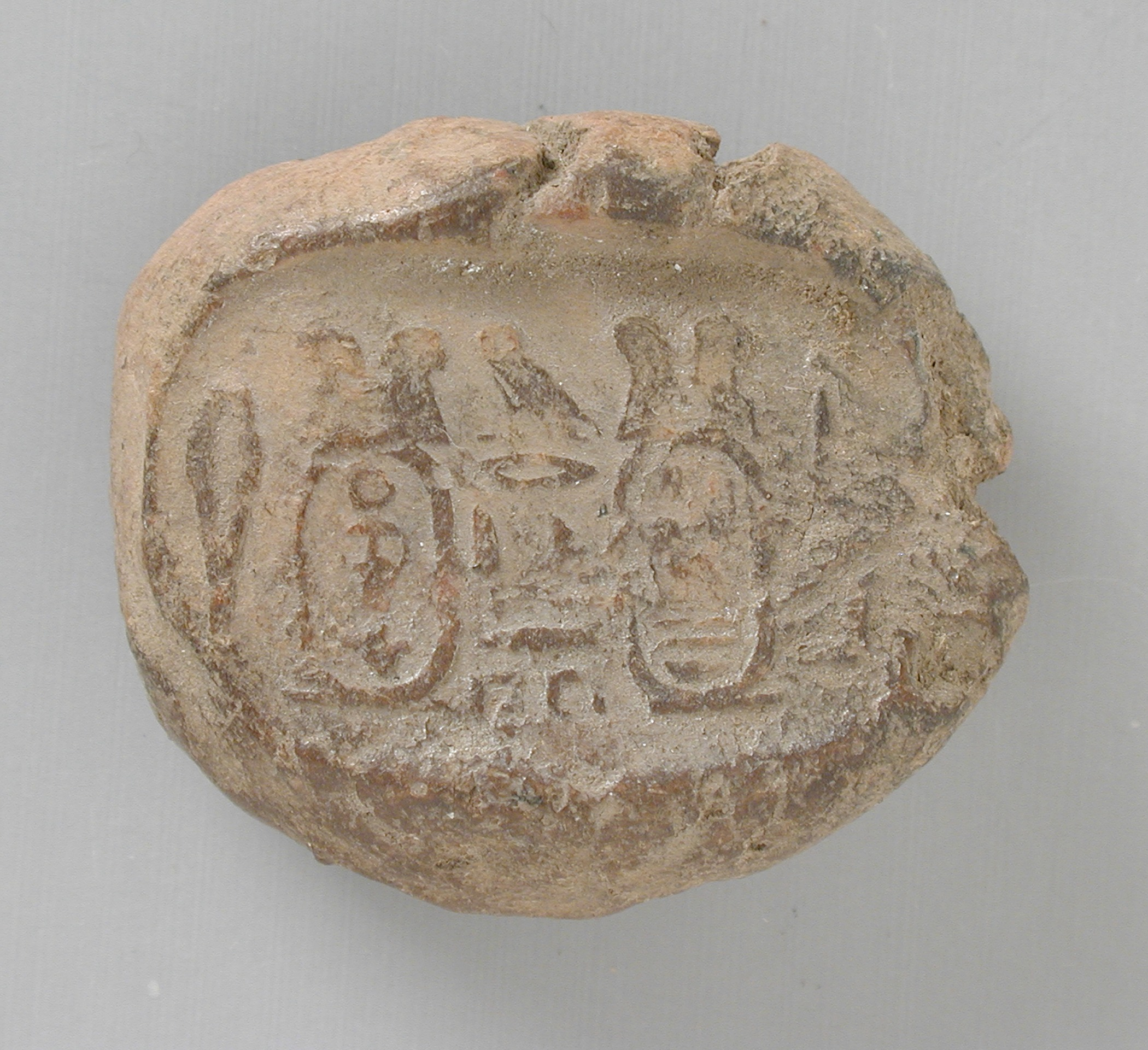
Egypt, Late Period, 26th Dynasty, probably reign of Amasis and Nitocris (569 - 525 BCE)

Nitocris II (or Nitokris II, Nitocris B, Egyptian: Nt-jqrt, Nitiqret) was an ancient Egyptian princess and priestess during the reign of pharaoh Amasis II of the 26th Dynasty.

== Biography ==
Daughter of Amasis II, Nitocris II is mainly attested by an inscription on a bronze sitting statuette of Amun-Ra now in the University of Chicago Oriental Institute (registration no. E10584A-B) on which she is called High Priest of Amun; the same object also claims that the God's Wife of Amun Ankhnesneferibre was her "mother". Nitocris' title is notable because she is the last attested holder of the once influential office of High Priest of Amun at Thebes, as well as one of only two known female holders; she may have reached this office around 560 BCE.

The fact that Ankhnesneferibre is called her "mother" suggests that Nitocris also held the office of Divine Adoratrice of Amun which usually led to the charge of God's Wife of Amun after the adoptive mother's death. However, it seems that Nitocris never managed to reach the latter position because these offices were abolished soon after the Persian invasion of Egypt in 525 BCE.

Preceded by ?	High Priest of Amun c.560–525 BCE	Succeeded by office abolished(?)
Preceded by Ankhnesneferibre	Divine Adoratrice of Amun ?–525 BCE	Succeeded by office abolished
