= Psamtik II =

Egyptian pharaoh

- Psammetichus II
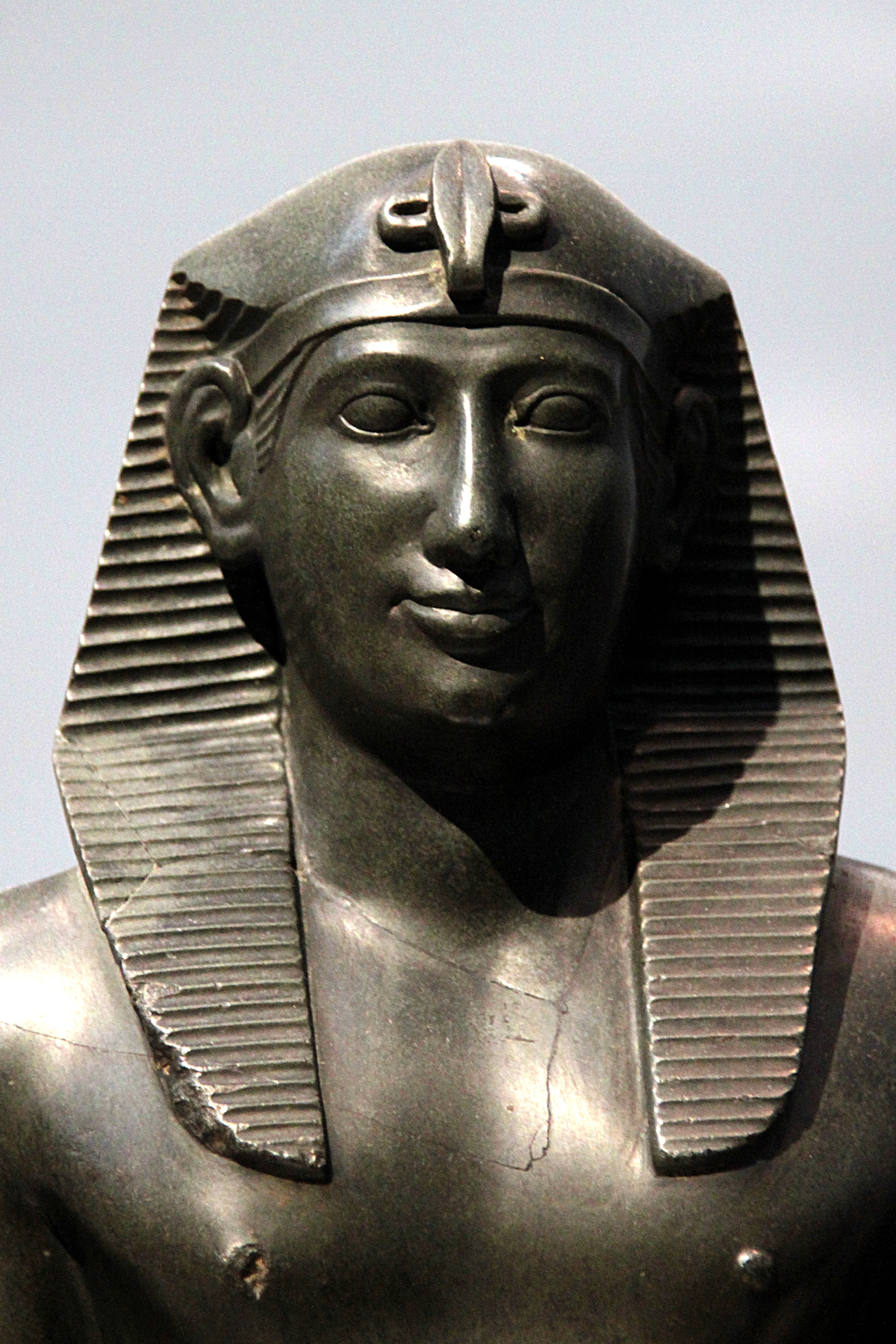
- Statue of Psamtik II, Louvre Museum

Pharaoh
- Reign: 595–589 BC
- Predecessor: Necho II
- Successor: Apries
Royal titulary
Horus name
Menekhib
G5	mn n x t U22 Z1
Prenomen
Neferibre

M23 X1 L2 X1	ra nfr ib
Nomen
Psamtik (Psammetichus)

G39 N5	p z m T k
- Consort: Takhuit
- Children: Apries, Ankhnesneferibre
- Father: Necho II
- Mother: Khedebneithirbinet I
- Died: 589 BC
- Dynasty: 26th dynasty

Psamtik II (Ancient Egyptian: Nfr-jb-Rꜥ Psmṯk, pronounced Psamāṯək), known by the Graeco-Romans as Psammetichus or Psammeticus, was a king of the Saite-based Twenty-sixth Dynasty of Egypt (595 BC – 589 BC). His prenomen, Nefer-Ib-Re, means "Beautiful [is the] Heart [of] Re." He was the son of Necho II.

== Campaigns and battles ==
Psamtik II led a foray into Nubia in 592 BC, marching as far south as the Third or even the Fourth Cataract of the Nile, according to a contemporary stela from Thebes (Karnak), which dates to Year 3 of this king's name and refers to a heavy defeat that was inflicted upon the kingdom of Kush.

Victory Stela of Kalabsha of Psamtik II commemorates his victory over Nubia. It is now located next to the Mandulis Temple on New Kalabsha.

A well-known graffito inscribed in Greek on the left leg of the colossal seated statue of Ramesses II, on the south side of the entrance to the temple of Abu Simbel, records that:

When King Psammetichus (i.e., Psamtik II) came to Elephantine, this was written by those who sailed with Psammetichus the son of Theocles, and they came beyond Kerkis as far as the river permits. Those who spoke foreign tongues (Greek and Carians who also scratched their names on the monument) were led by Potasimto, the Egyptians by Amasis.

Kerkis was located near the Fifth Cataract of the Nile "which stood well within the Cushite Kingdom."

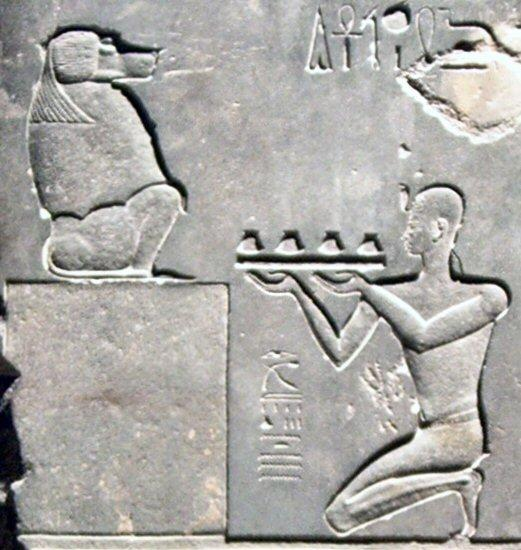
Psamtik II making an offering

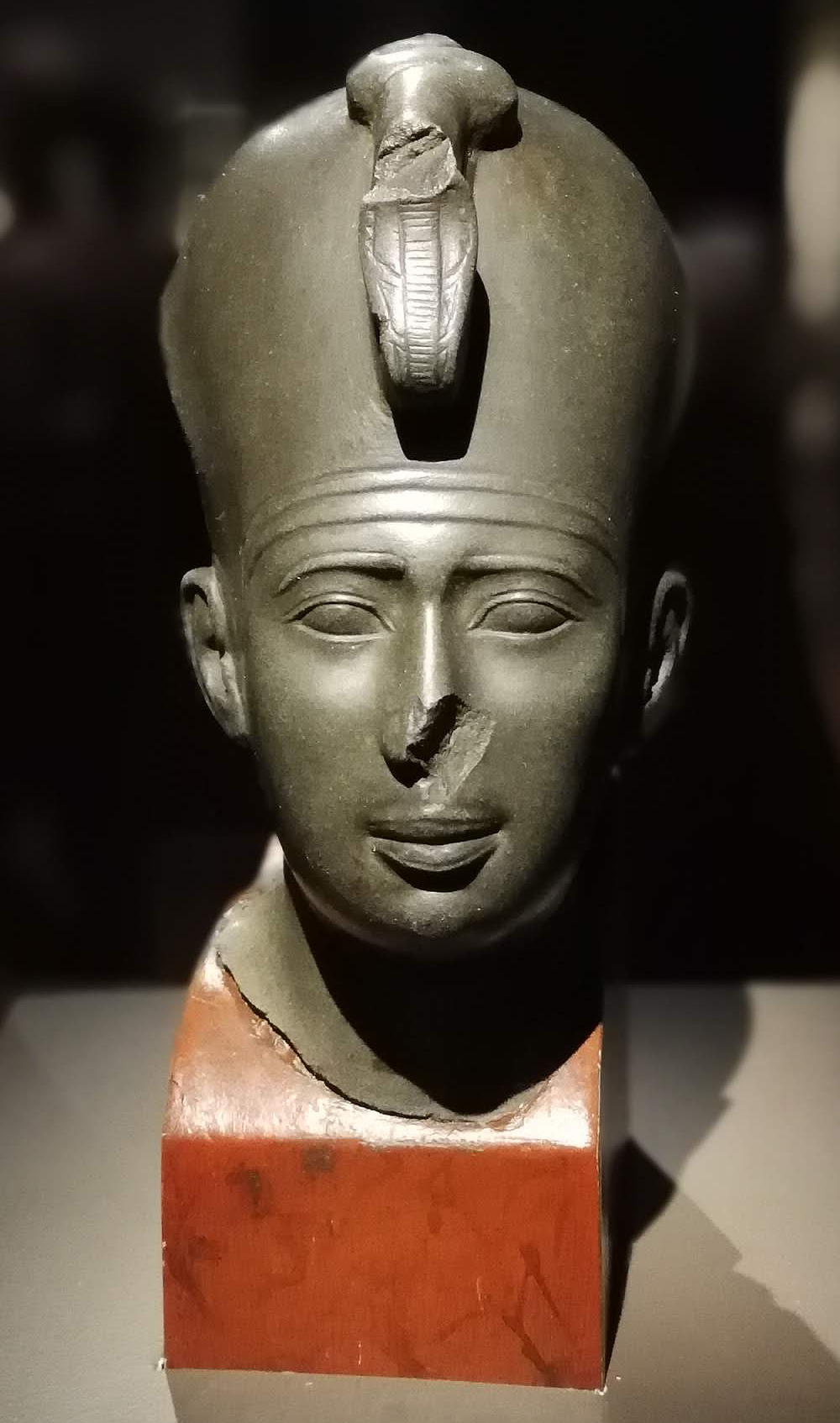
Statue of Psamtik II. Musée Jacquemart-André

This was the first confrontation between Egypt and Nubia since the reign of Tantamani. A Kushite king named Anlamani had revived the power of the kingdom of Napata. Psamtik II's campaign was likely initiated to destroy any future aspirations the Kushites may have had to reconquer Egypt. The Egyptian army advanced to Pnubs (Kerma) and the capital city of Napata in a series of fierce battles, where they looted its temples and destroyed the royal Kushite statues. The Kushite capital was sacked under the reign of the native Kushite king Aspelta who was the younger brother of Anlamani and the son of Senkamanisken. The Year 3 Karnak stela is dated to II Shemu day 10 of Psamtik II's reign and states that:

The army that your Majesty sent to Nubia has reached the land of Pnubs....Nubians from all parts [of Kush] had arisen against him, their hearts full of anger when he attacked those who had rebelled against him there; because he was furious at those who had arisen against him. His Majesty took part in the combat as soon as he reached the battle. The rebels capitulated before a single arrow was unleashed against them....Those who tried to flee did not succeed and were brought back as prisoners: four thousand two hundred men.

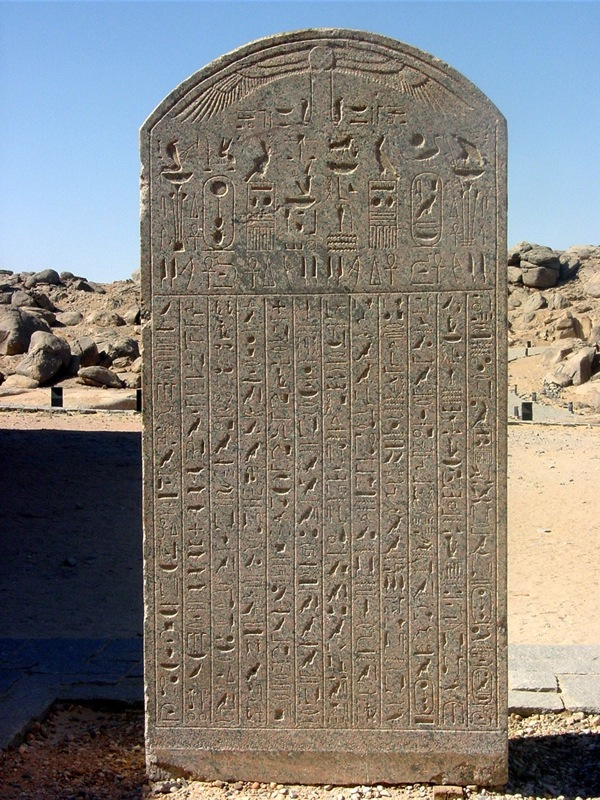
Psamtik II's Victory Stela of Kalabsha records his campaign against Kush

As a result of Psamtik's campaign, Kush's power was weakened, and its lost the opportunity of regaining control of Egypt as they were intending. Instead, the Nubian rulers decided to shift their capital further south from Napata to the relative safety of Meroë although most Historians agree that this wasn't the only reason. Curiously, however, Psamtik II does not appear to have capitalized on his victory, possibly because of lack of troops after the fierce battle. His troops retreated back to the First Cataract, and Elephantine continued to be the southern border of Egypt.

An outcome of this campaign was the deliberate destruction of monuments belonging to the 25th Dynasty Kushite kings in Egypt "by hacking out their names and the emblems of royalty from their statues and reliefs." Later, in 591 BC, during the fourth year of his reign, Psamtik II launched an expedition into Palestine "to foment a general Levantine revolt against the Babylonians" that involved, among others, Zedekiah of the Kingdom of Judah. Or according to Dan’el Kahn, "592 B.C. seems to be the date of the military reconquest of the Levant by Psammetichus II."

== Monuments ==
Psamtik II was both a dynamic warrior pharaoh as well as a prolific builder in his brief 6-year reign. A significant Saite temple was likely built by Psamtik II and his son Apries at the village of El-Mahalla El-Kubra which lies equidistant from Sebennytos and Behbeit El-Hagar in the Lower Nile Delta. Officials from the Napoleonic expedition to Egypt observed "an extraordinary number of pharaonic building elements of granite and turquoise reused in modern buildings" at this site; this discovery was subsequently confirmed by Nestor L'Hôte in 1828 who counted more than 120 granite columns built into this village's mosque alone. A 1.8 metre long fragment of red granite with the name of Psamtik II and a door lintel of Apries was also seen at El-Mahalla El-Kubra.

Under Psamtik II's reign, a pair of obelisks more than 21.79 metres high were erected in the temple of Heliopolis; the first Emperor of Rome, Augustus, later had one of the obelisks, today known as the Obelisk of Montecitorio, which had probably been thrown down by the Persian invaders in 525 BC, brought to Rome in 10 BC. Psamtik II also constructed a kiosk on Philae island. This kiosk today "represents the oldest known monument known on the island" and consisted "of a double row of four columns, which were connected by screen walls."

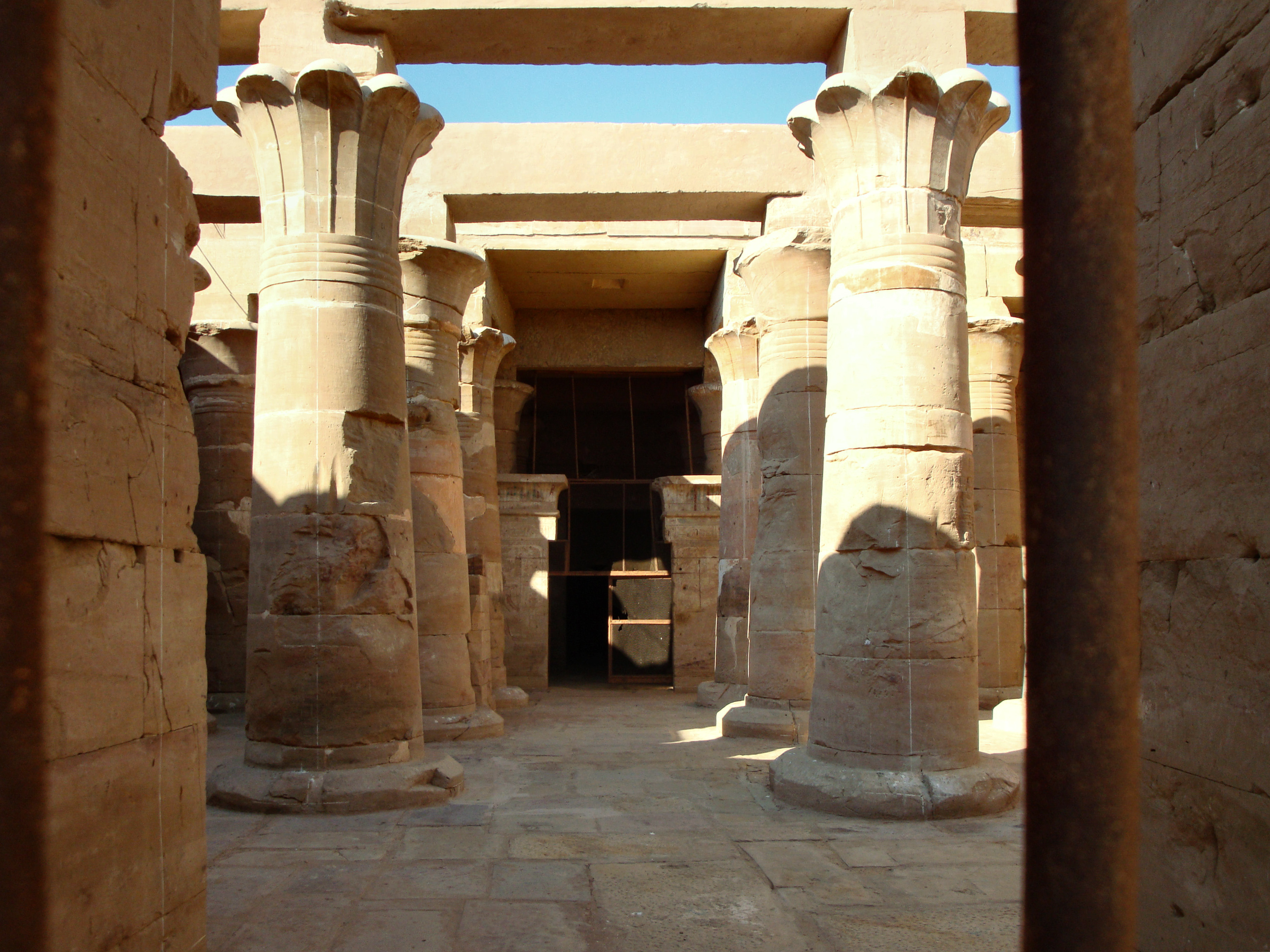
The Temple of Hibis was founded by Psamtik II at Kharga Oasis.

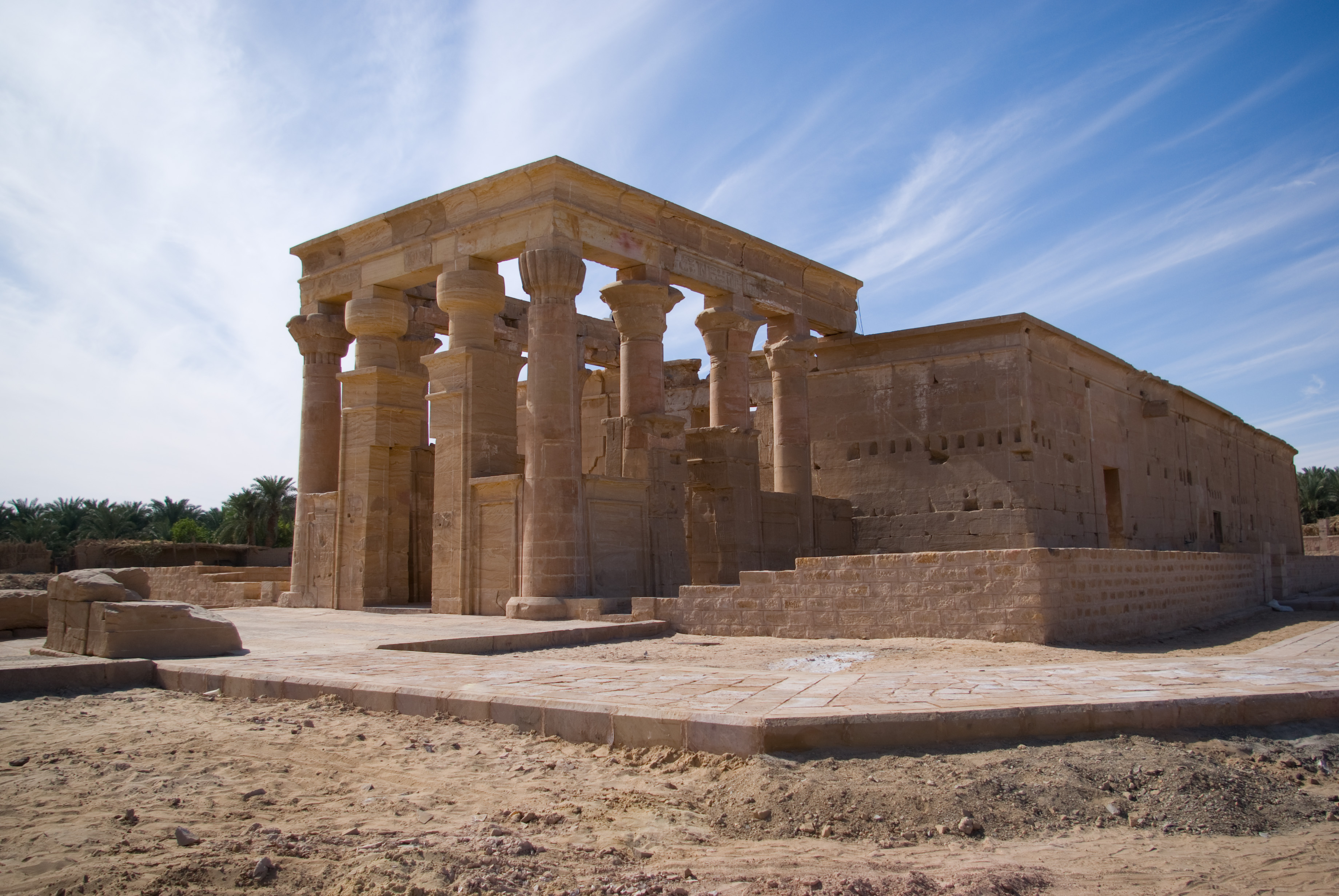
Another view of the reconstructed Temple of Hibis at Kharga Oasis in December 2008.

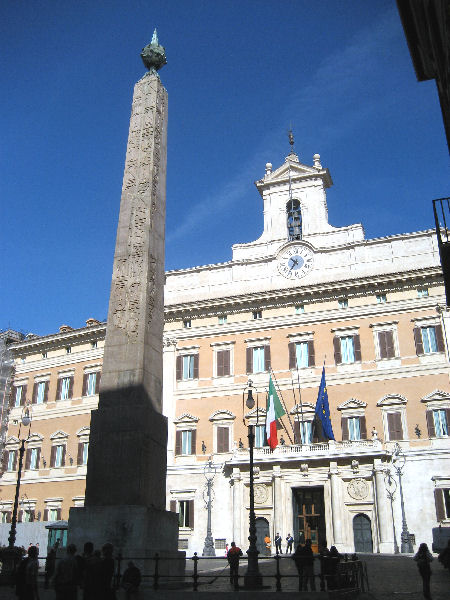
Obelisk of Psamtik II, now called "Obelisk of Montecitorio", used as a Roman sundial, the famous Horologium Augusti, in Rome. In the background is the Italian Chamber of Deputies building

Psamtik II was also responsible for founding the Temple-house at Hibis in El-Kharga Oasis for the triad of Amun, Mut, and Khonsu with significant installations for the cult of Osiris. This 19.5 x 26 metre temple was originally situated on the bank of an ancient lake which has now disappeared and its temple decorations were only completed under the Persian kings Darius I and possibly Darius II. The Hibis temple consisted of a hypostyle hall with two-by-two papyrus capital columns, a hall of offerings, three sanctuaries in the rear section of the temple and a chapel at the side of the sanctuaries for the cult of Psamtik II. The front of the temple house of Hibis featured:

"a pronaos with four papyrus bundle columns and screen walls. During the construction of the pronaos, the side walls were extended for the addition of a court[yard]. This extension, was, however, only carried out in the 30th Dynasty [by Nectanebo I and Nectanebo II.] The eight papyrus columns of the pronaos still show the New Kingdom type of open, bell-shaped capitals."

A massive sandstone gateway through an outer enclosure wall still stands almost 5 metres tall and was constructed during the Ptolemaic or Roman periods. Many inscriptions and decrees were carved on the gateway on a wide variety of topics such as taxation, inheritance, the court system and the rights of women, with the earliest text dating to 49 AD.

The Temple of Psamtik II at Hibis was completely preserved until 1832 when its roof and portions of the temple were removed for the construction of an aluminium factory. Only excavation work by the Metropolitan Museum of Art in 1910-1911 and restorations performed by the Egyptian Antiquities Service arrested its decline. Today, the Hibis temple remains—together with the Oracle or Ammoneion of Siwa—as "the best preserved and best-documented temple of the early Egyptian Late Period and is therefore a primary monument to the history of [Egyptian temple] building."

== Olympic Games ==
According to Herodotus, Psamtik was

visited by ambassadors from Elis, the Eleans boasting that they had ordered the Olympic games with all the justice and fairness in the world, and claiming that even the Egyptians, albeit the wisest of all men, could not better it. When the Eleans came to Egypt and told the purpose of their coming, Psamtik summoned an assembly of those who were said to be the wisest men in Egypt. These assembled, and inquired of the Eleans, who told them of the rules of the games which they must obey, and, having declared these, said they had come that if the Egyptians could invent any juster way they might learn this too. The Egyptians consulted together, and then asked the Eleans if their own townsmen took part in the contests. The Eleans answered that this was so: all Greeks might contend. Then the Egyptians said that this rule was wholly wide of justice: "For," said they, "it cannot be but that you will favour your own townsmen in the contest and deal unfairly by a stranger. Nay, if you will indeed make just rules and have therefore come to Egypt, you should admit only strangers to the contest, and not Eleans." Such was the counsel of the Egyptians to the Eleans.

== Successor ==
When Psamtik II died in 589 BC, he was succeeded by Apries who was his son by Queen Takhut, a Princess of Athribis. Psamtik and Queen Takhut were also the parents of Menekhubaste, a Priestess of Atum at Heliopolis, and Ankhnesneferibre, a God's Wife of Amun who served in this powerful office in Upper Egypt to the end of the Saite period in 525 BC, when Egypt was conquered by the Persians. The date of Psamtik II's death is mentioned in the Adoption stela of Ankhnesneferibre: Year 7, I Akhet day 23.
