= Sack of Thebes =

Assyrian plunder of Kushite Thebes

- Part of the Assyrian conquest of Egypt
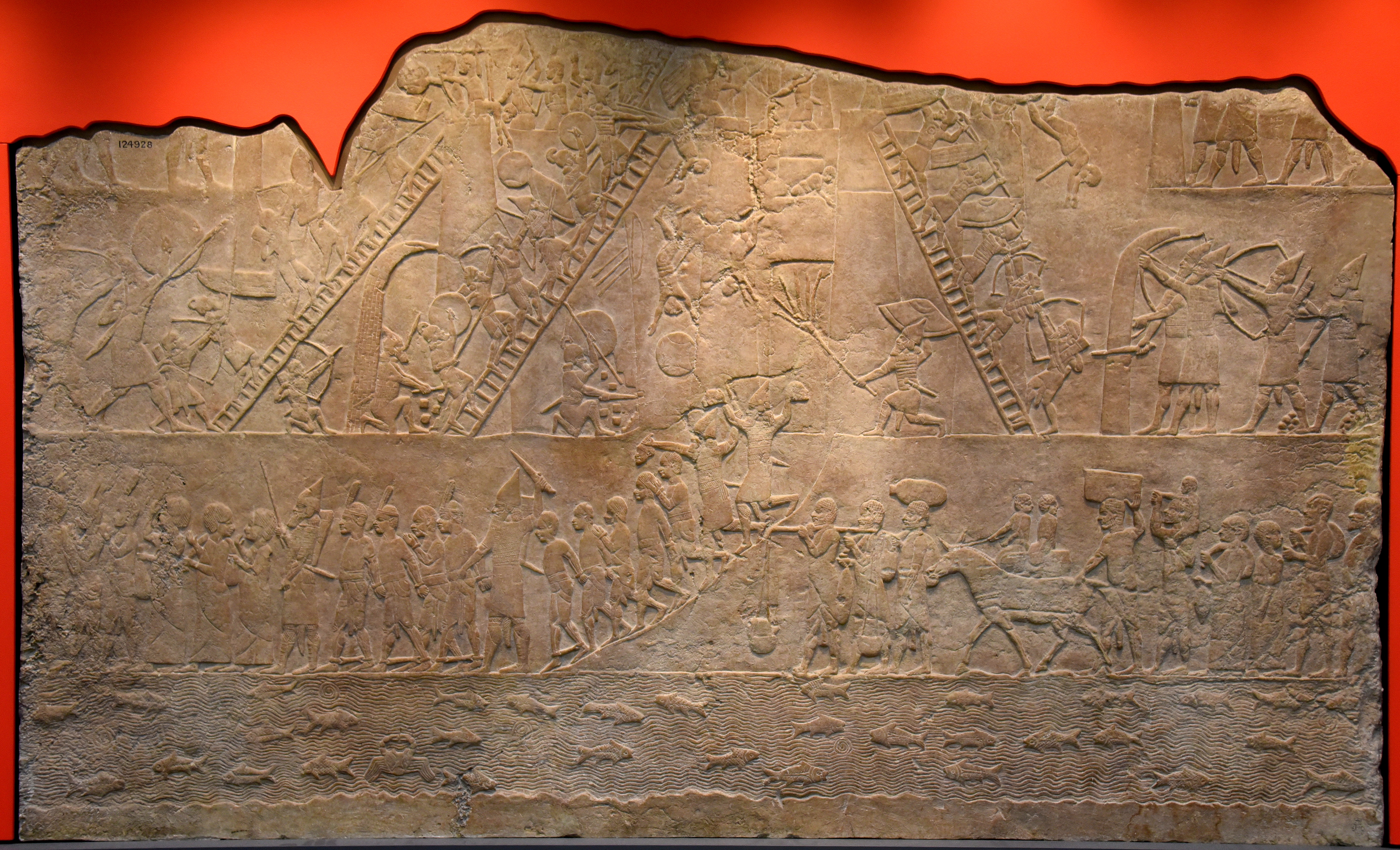
- Assyrian siege of an Egyptian fort, probably a scene from the war in 667-663 BCE. Sculpted in 645 – 635 BCE, under Ashurbanipal. British Museum.
Date	663 BC
Location	Thebes, Egypt
Result	Assyrian victory

Belligerents
Neo-Assyrian Empire; Egyptian vassals	Kushite Egypt

Commanders and leaders
Ashurbanipal; Psamtik I	Tantamani

Units involved
Assyrian military Psamtik's forces, including Carian mercenaries	Tantamani's army

The sack of Thebes took place in 663 BC in the city of Thebes at the hands of the Neo-Assyrian Empire under king Ashurbanipal, then at war with the Kushite Twenty-fifth Dynasty of Egypt under Tantamani, during the Assyrian conquest of Egypt. After a long struggle for the control of the Levant which had started in 705 BC, the Kushites had gradually lost control of Lower Egypt and, by 665 BC, their territory was reduced to Upper Egypt and Nubia. Helped by the unreliable vassals of the Assyrians in the Nile Delta region, Tantamani briefly regained Memphis in 663 BC, killing Necho I of Sais in the process.

On learning of these events, Ashurbanipal aided by Necho's son, Psamtik I and his Carian mercenaries, returned to Egypt with a large army and comprehensively defeated the Kushites near Memphis. The army then proceeded south to Thebes, which quickly fell as Tantamani had already fled to Lower Nubia. According to Assyrian texts, the city was thoroughly sacked, its inhabitants were deported and much booty taken back to Assyria, including two large obelisks. To the contrary, the archaeological evidence from Thebes shows no signs of destruction, plunder or major changes. The evidence shows more signs of continuity than of disruption: all the officials that were in office before the alleged sack of Thebes were still in office afterwards and the development of tombs on the western bank of Thebes continued without interruption. In the publications of Diethelm Eigner or Julia Budka, the Assyrian sack of Thebes is not archaeologically detected.

The sack of Thebes was a major event in the history of the city and of ancient Egypt in general. It effectively marks the end of the 25th Dynasty of Egypt as Tantamani lost his main foothold in Egypt. The Kushites were permanently expelled within a decade of the fall of Thebes as none of Tantamani's successors would ever manage to retake territories north of Elephantine. Durably weakened, Thebes peacefully submitted itself less than six years after the sack to a large fleet sent by Psamtik to control Upper Egypt as he freed himself from the Assyrian vassalage. The sack thus permitted the rise of the Twenty-sixth Dynasty, the end of the Third Intermediate Period and the beginning of the Late Period. The sack seems to have reverberated more generally throughout the Ancient Near East, it is notably mentioned in the Hebrew version of the Book of Nahum as an example of the destruction and horror that can befall a city. (Note: The Hebrew Masoretic Text refers to Thebes in the past tense. However, both the Septuagint and Vulgate versions of the book do not.)

== Background ==
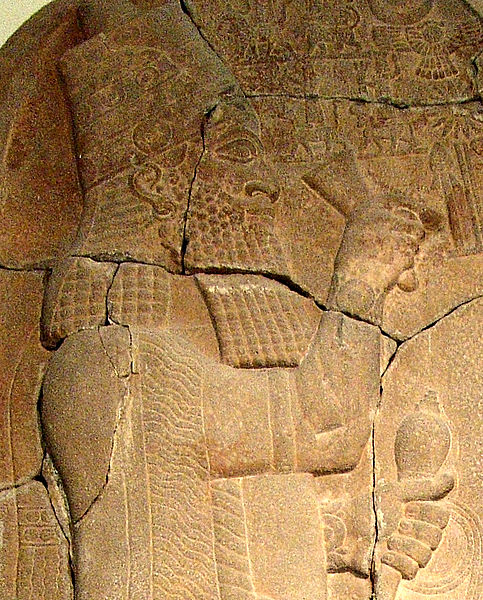
Esarhaddon struggled with Taharqa for the domination of the Levant and then of Egypt.

In the late 8th century BC, Egypt and Nubia were united and ruled by the Kushite pharaohs of the Twenty-fifth Dynasty of Egypt. The Neo-Assyrian Empire was already extending its influence over the Levant at the same period, and in the spring of 720 BC Piye or perhaps Shebitku fought and lost a first battle against the Assyrians near Rafah.

The situation did not change owing to the Assyrian hegemony until c. 705 BC when the death of Sargon II led to revolts against the Assyrians throughout their empire. Shebitku's successor Shabaka seized the occasion and return to the Levantine coast, where he was free to roam until c. 701 BC when Sennacherib was finally able to assemble an army and win over the Egyptians at Eltekeh. Following these events, Shebitku and his successor Taharqa enjoyed a period of peace and managed to increase their influence once more over the Levant and along the Phoenician coast. This situation went unchecked until c. 679 BC, at which point Esarhaddon led a military campaign up to the Brook of Egypt and then in Phoenicia c. 676 BC. The results of these activities was to put the Levant firmly into Assyrian hands. However, by this time Essarhadon had realized that a conquest of Lower Egypt was necessary in order to permanently reduce the Kushite threat on the Levant.

In March of 673 BC, Essarhadon sent a large military force to Egypt, possibly via the Wadi Tumilat but was defeated by the Egyptians under Pemu, then ruler of Heliopolis for the Kushites. Esarhaddon returned two years later in the summer of 671 BC and after a number of battles, was able to take Memphis, wound Taharqa, capture his brother and his son Nes-Anhuret, the alleged heir to the throne. (Note: At the time, the Kingdom of Kush had no official position of crown prince or heir to the throne; often, younger sons, siblings or other relatives took power after the death of a monarch. It is most likely that the Assyrians used their own concepts of rulership to describe their captives, not those used by the Nubians themselves.) Taharqa's remaining son, Atlanersa, was then likely too young to reign and another brother of Taharqa, Tantamani would ultimately ascend the throne. As a consequence, the Kushites were temporarily expelled from Lower Egypt, which largely passed under the control of Assyrian vassals, in particular Necho I in Sais. To what extent the Assyrians actually installed their own officials is unclear; they probably did not leave a garrison behind. However, they did order mass deportations and gave several old Egyptian cities new Assyrian names like "Assur has widened his land".

In spite of these successes for the Assyrians, the Egyptian vassals in the Delta region were unruly and Taharqa was attempting to return to Lower Egypt. Esarhaddon launched a novel military expedition c. 669 BC but died that year, allowing Taharqa to retake Memphis and, finally, the Delta region in late 668 BC. In 667 BC, Esarhaddon's heir Ashurbanipal decided to re-establish the Assyrian dominion over Egypt, invading the land in October of that year and going up to Thebes, where they defeated Taharqa while simultaneously quelling a rebellion in the Delta. Soon after, Taharqa might have won some victory in Thebes which allowed him to keep control of Upper Egypt. In Lower Egypt, Necho was reinstated vassal king of Sais in spite of his betrayal. The situation did not change until 664 BC with Taharqa's death.

== The year 663 BC ==
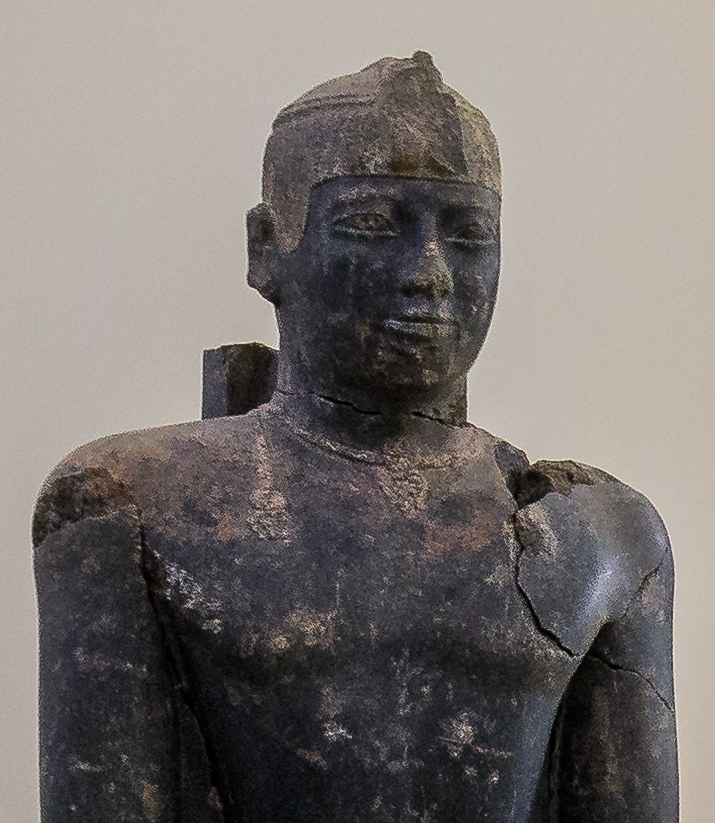
Tantamani failed to hold Memphis after the arrival of the Assyrians.

=== Tantamani's failed reconquest ===
Taharqa was succeeded by Tantamani at his death. Tantamani was traditionally believed to be Taharqa's brother, but later research has instead provided strong evidence for Tantamani being the son of Shabaka. Tantamani immediately launched a massive military campaign aiming once more at uniting Egypt under the rule of the 25th Dynasty. His army travelled north, stopping at Napata, Elephantine, Thebes and Heliopolis fortifying both in 664 BC. Tantamani arrived in Memphis in April 663 BC and killed Necho I during the ensuing fight near the city. Tantamani then proceeded north and received the capitulation of some but not all Delta kinglets, then expulsed the remaining Assyrian troops from Egypt while Necho's young son Psamtik managed to flee to Assyria via Palestine.

=== Sack ===
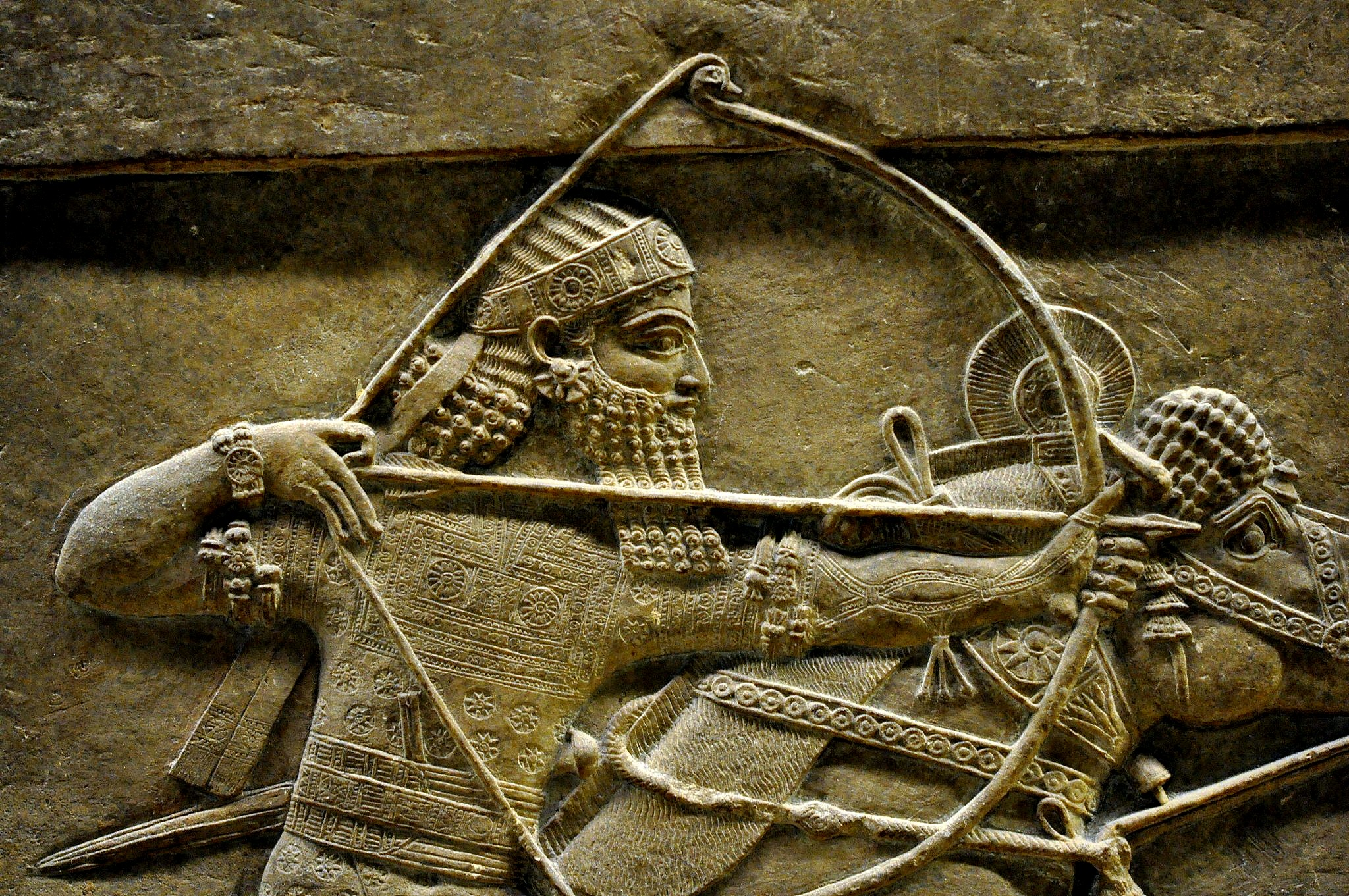
Ashurbanipal sacked Thebes but failed to durably establish the Assyrian presence there.

The Assyrians soon returned to Egypt. Together with Psamtik I's army, which comprised Carian mercenaries, they fought a pitched battle in north Memphis, close to the temple of Isis, between the Serapeum and Abusir. Tantamani was defeated and fled to Upper Egypt but just 40 days after the battle, Ashurbanipal's army arrived in Thebes. Tantamani had already left the city for "Kipkipi". This has been identified as a location that remains uncertain but might be Kom Ombo, some 200 km (120 mi) south of Thebes. Other researchers believe that "Kipkipi" was not a location at all, but a foul expression used to convey that Tantamani "was screwed". Thebes itself was conquered "smashed (as if by) a floodstorm" and heavily plundered. The event is not mentioned in Egyptian sources but is known from the Assyrian annals, which report that the inhabitants were deported. The Assyrians took a large booty of gold, silver, precious stones, clothes, horses, fantastic animals, as well as two obelisks covered in electrum weighing 2,500 talents (c. 75.5 tons, or 166,500 lb). It has also been interpreted by biblical scholars that a reference to Thebes in the Book of Nahum refers to this event.

This city, the whole of it, I conquered it with the help of Ashur and Ishtar. Silver, gold, precious stones, all the wealth of the palace, rich cloth, precious linen, great horses, supervising men and women, two obelisks of splendid electrum, weighing 2,500 talents, the doors of temples I tore from their bases and carried them off to Assyria. With this weighty booty I left Thebes. Against Egypt and Kush I have lifted my spear and shown my power. With full hands I have returned to Nineveh, in good health.

— Rassam cylinder of Ashurbanipal

However, it is possible that Thebes did not fall entirely. The Assyrian texts suggest that part of the Kushite-Egyptian garrison crossed the Nile and was able to hold out at a fort in Medinet Habu. Accordingly, only the temple districts of the city would have been completely plundered by the Assyrians, though these districts were by far the most rich parts of the settlement.

== Aftermath ==
=== Kushite kingdom of Napata ===
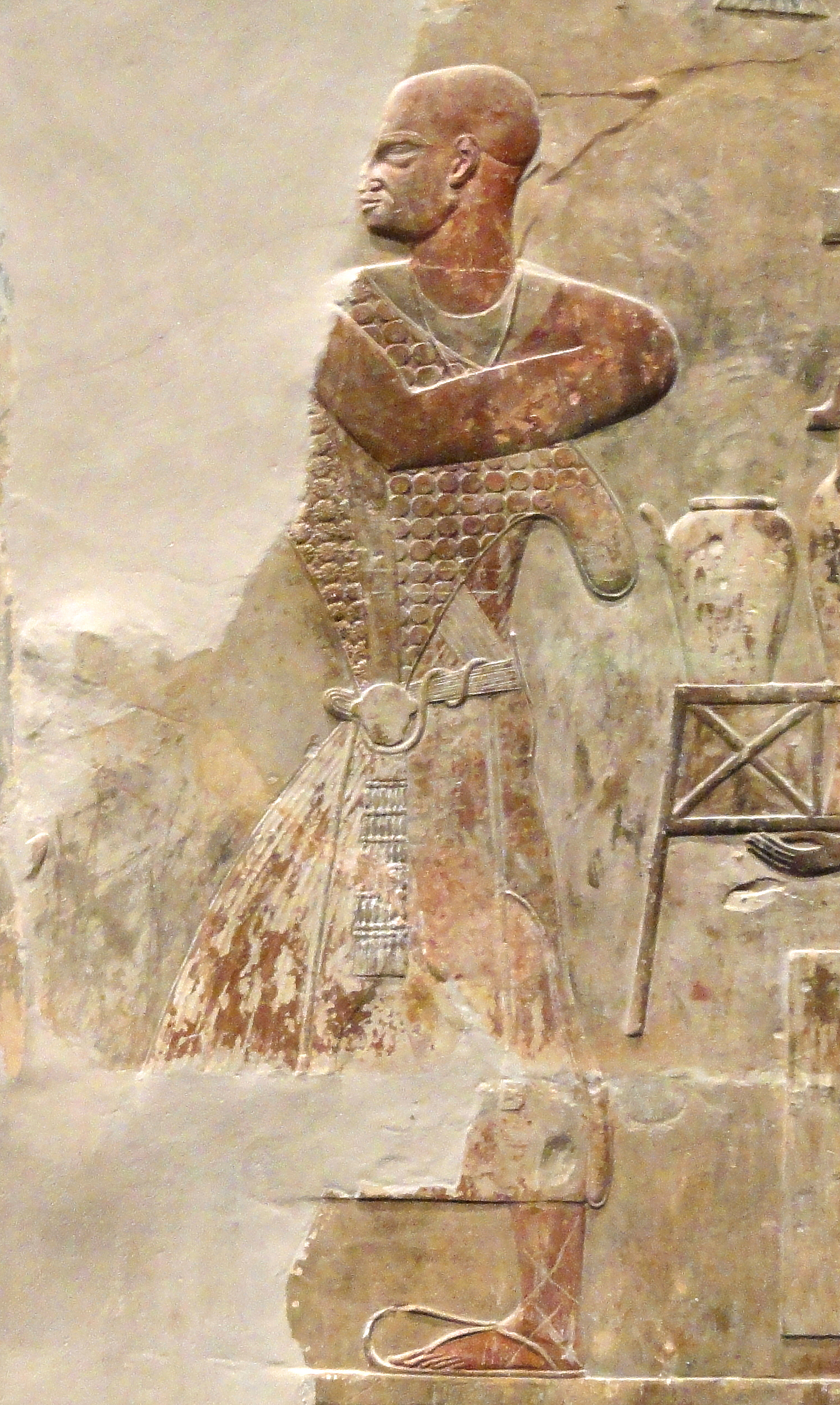
Portrait of Mentuemhat, Thebes, late 25th to early 26th Dynasty, 665–650 BCE. Nelson-Atkins Museum of Art

Concurrently or soon after the sack, the Kushite army withdrew from Egypt in large numbers, a momentous event that was still remembered some 200 years later and gave rise to Herodotus' story about 240,000 Egyptian deserters settling in Nubia.

Tantamani's fate after the loss of Thebes is not entirely clear: he seems to have ruled for some time as king of Kush, as suggested by a relief of him in Jebel Barkal. Indirect evidence points to a continued Kushite presence in Upper Egypt between 661 BC and 656 BC: monuments show that the Thebans continued to acknowledge the sovereignty of Tantamani until as late as 656 BC, although the actual extent of his power is uncertain. Many Nubian officials and relatives of the Kushite kings also maintained their positions in Egypt for decades. For instance, the supreme authority in Thebes seems to have been in the hands of Mentuemhat and his wife Shepenupet II; the latter was a Nubian princess.

By 653 BC Tantamani's successor Atlanersa was on the throne and he reigned solely over Nubia, with his seat of power in Napata, starting the so called Napatan period of Nubia. Although Atlanersa and his successors styled themselves as Egyptian pharaohs, and some might have launched further attempts to regain power in the north, none of them succeeded in retaking Egypt. After imposing his authority over Upper Egypt, Psamtik I established a garrison on Elephantine and may have led a military campaign in Nubia. By the time of Psamtik II, c. 590 BC the Egyptians had sacked Napata.

=== End of the Assyrian presence ===
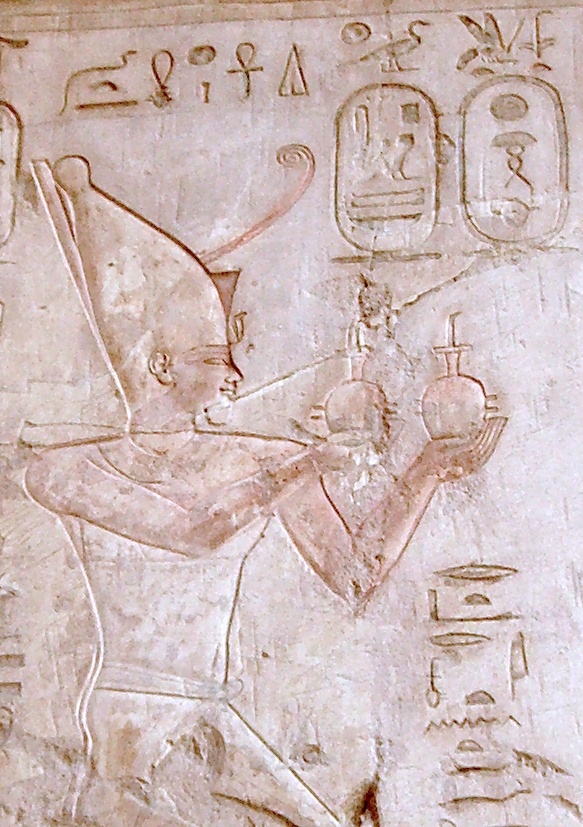
Ultimately, Psamtik I was the main beneficiary of the sack of Thebes.

The Assyrians did not hold Thebes for long: already by 662 BC, one year after the sack, some Thebans were dating their documents as per Tantamani's years of reign, suggesting that the Assyrians had already left the region. Around the time of the sack, Ashurbanipal was personally involved in two conflicts in Phoenicia, submitting Arwad and Tyre. Soon after he participated in further campaigns against the Mannai, the Elamites and the Medes, all between 665 BC and 655 BC, which might explain why he did not maintain an Assyrian presence in Thebes.

=== Late Period of Egypt ===
In the decade following the sack, the Assyrian influence in Egypt quickly waned as Psamtik I not only dominated the other kinglets of the Delta region but also managed to free himself from Assyrian vassalage. With Thebes' influence and outreach deeply weakened, Psamtik sent a strong military fleet to the city in 656 BC and immediately received its submission. To affirm his control over the city, he had his daughter Nitocris I adopted by Amenirdis II, who was not only the daughter of Taharqa but also the Divine Adoratrice of Amun, then the pinnacle of the powerful priesthood of Amun in the city. Psamtik then had only to secure Egypt's southern border by putting a garrison on Elephantine to submit the whole of Upper Egypt for himself.

In 655 BC, Psamtik turned against his Assyrian overlord aided once more by Ionian and Carian mercenaries and allied with Gyges of Lydia. He expelled the remaining Assyrians from Lower Egypt and pursued them as far as Ashdod. Ashurbanipal then deeply embroiled in war against the Elamites had no army to send to Egypt. In the span of seven years, Psamtik had effectively united and freed Egypt, which marked the beginning of the Late Period.
