= Ankhnesneferibre =

Ancient Egyptian princess and priestess

- God's Wife of Amun; Divine Adoratrice of Amun
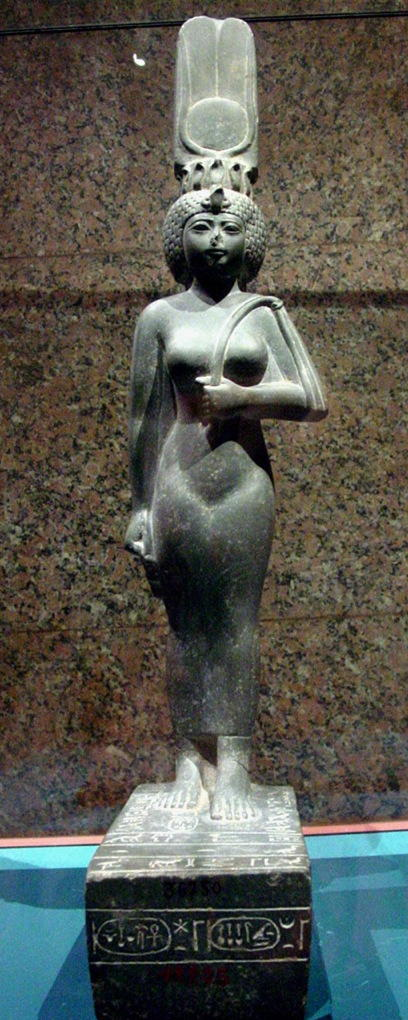
- Statue CG 42205 of Ankhenesneferibre, now in the Nubian Museum, Aswan
Egyptian name
Royal titulary
Prenomen
< t G14 S38 nfr t Z2 >
Heqatneferumut (Meritmut)
ḥq3t -nfrw-Mwt
Nomen
anx n s < ra nfr ib >
Ankhnesneferibre
ˁnḫ-n.s-Nfrjbrˁ
Neferibre (i.e. Psamtik II) lives for her
- Tenure: 595–525 BC
- Predecessor: Nitocris I
- Successor: Nitocris II (as Divine Adoratrice) office abolished (as God's Wife)
- Burial: Medinet Habu
- Father: Psamtik II
- Mother: Takhuit

Ankhnesneferibre was an ancient Egyptian princess and priestess during the 26th Dynasty, daughter of pharaoh Psamtik II and his queen Takhuit. She held the positions of Divine Adoratrice of Amun and later God's Wife of Amun between 595 and 525 BC, during the reigns of Psamtik II, Apries, Amasis II and Psamtik III, until the Achaemenid conquest of Egypt.

== Biography ==
In 595 BC, Ankhnesneferibre was dispatched to Thebes to be adopted by the God's Wife of Amun Nitocris I, as a stela from Karnak records. Ankhnesneferibre held the position of Divine Adoratrice until Nitocris' death in pharaoh Apries' regnal Year 4 (586 BC), after which she became the new God's Wife. She governed at Thebes for several decades until 525 BC, when the Persian emperor Cambyses II defeated Psamtik III and conquered Egypt, putting an end to the 26th Dynasty and the positions of Divine Adoratrice of Amun and God's Wife of Amun. After this date, Ankhnesneferibre disappeared from history as the last God's Wife, as did her likely successor, the Divine Adoratrice Nitocris II. As with many of her predecessors, Ankhnesneferibre's tomb is located within the temple of Medinet Habu.

For Ankhnesneferibre several attestations are known, above all a statue depicting her now exhibited at the Nubian Museum of Aswan (CG 42205), and her black basalt sarcophagus, which was subsequently reused in Deir el-Medina during the Ptolemaic period by a man named Pymentu, and which is today located in the British Museum.

== Ancestry ==
Ancestors of Ankhnesneferibre

Pharaoh Psamtik I
Pharaoh Necho II
Queen Mehytenweskhet
Pharaoh Psamtik II
Queen Khedebneithirbinet I
Ankhnesneferibre
Queen Takhuit

Preceded by Nitocris I	Divine Adoratrice of Amun; 595–? BC	Succeeded by Nitocris II
Preceded by Nitocris I	God's Wife of Amun; 586–525 BC	Succeeded by office abolished
