= Nubkhesbed =

- Queen consort of Egypt
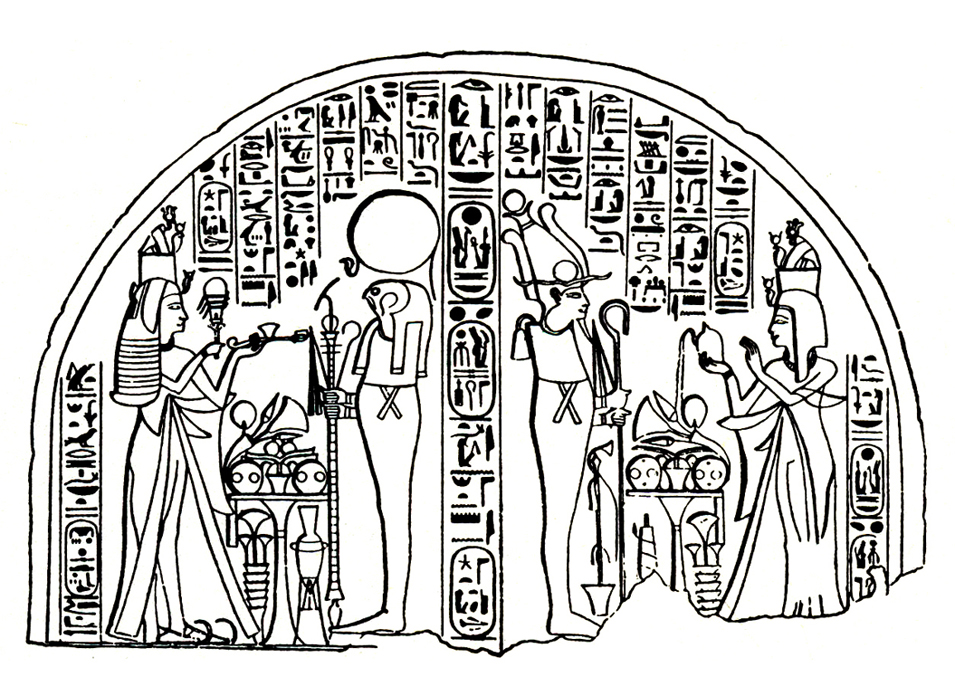
- Nubkhesbed (left) giving offerings to Re-Horakhty on the stela of her daughter Iset
- Burial: unknown
- Spouse: Pharaoh Ramesses VI
- Issue: Ramesses VII; Prince Amenherkhepshef D Prince Panebenkemyt; Princess Iset (God's Wife of Amun)
- Dynasty: 20th Dynasty of Egypt
- Father: unknown
- Mother: unknown
- Religion: Ancient Egyptian religion

S12 D12 Z2 x O34 d Z2 b
Nubkhesbed
in hieroglyphs
Era: New Kingdom
(1550–1069 BC)

< S12 Z2 D12 x O34 d b D12 Z2 M2 >
Nubkhesbed
in hieroglyphs
Era: New Kingdom
(1550–1069 BC)

Nubkhesbed ("Gold and Lapis lazuli") was an ancient Egyptian queen of the 20th Dynasty. She was the Great Royal Wife of Pharaoh Ramesses VI and mother of Pharaoh Ramesses VII, Princess Iset (God's Wife of Amun) and Princes Amenherkhepshef and Panebenkemyt.

She is mentioned in her son Amenherkhepshef's tomb KV13 and on a stela of her daughter Iset in Coptos.
