= Amenirdis =

i mn n ir rdi s
or
i mn n ir D37 z
Amenirdis
in hieroglyphs

Amenirdis (or Amonardis; masculine ỉmn-ỉr-dỉ-sw – Amenirdisu, feminine ỉmn-ỉr-dỉ-st – Amenirdiset; gendered endings were mostly not pronounced by the time the name was popular) is an ancient Egyptian name meaning "he/she was given by Amun".

Notable bearers of the name include:

- Amenirdisu or Amyrtaeus, only pharaoh of the Twenty-eighth dynasty
- Amenirdis I, God's Wife of Amun during the Twenty-fifth dynasty
- Amenirdis II, Divine Adoratrice of Amun during the Twenty-fifth dynasty
