= God's Wife of Amun =

Highest-ranking priestess of the Amun cult

R8 N41 X1 N35 M17 Y5 N35
ḥm.t nṯr n ỉmn
Hemetnetjer-en-Amun
in hieroglyphs
Era: 3rd Intermediate Period
(1069–664 BC)

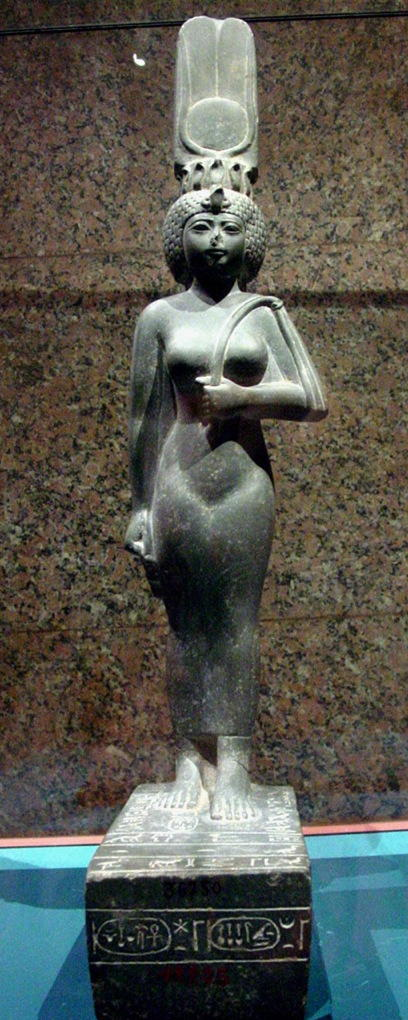
Statue of the God's Wife of Amun and Divine Adoratrice of Amun, Ankhnesneferibre

God's Wife of Amun (Egyptian: ḥm.t nṯr n ỉmn) was the highest-ranking priestess of the Amun cult, an important religious institution in ancient Egypt. The cult was centered in Thebes in Upper Egypt during the Twenty-fifth and Twenty-sixth dynasties (circa 740–525 BC). The office had political importance as well as religious, since the two were closely related in ancient Egypt.

Although the title is first attested in the Middle Kingdom, its full political potential was not realized until the advent of the Eighteenth Dynasty.

== History of the office ==
nTr N41 X1

The shorter version of the title, God's Wife, is in use by the time of the Twelfth Dynasty, when the title is attested for the non-royal women Iy-meret-nebes and Neferu. As early as the First Intermediate Period, there is mention of a "Wife of the God" in reference to the god Min. The full title of God's Wife of Amun is only used during and after the Eighteenth Dynasty.

=== Rise and fall in the Eighteenth Dynasty ===
At the beginning of the New Kingdom, the God's Wife of Amun royal title started to be held by royal women (usually the wife of the king, but sometimes by the mother of the king), when its extreme power and prestige was first evident. The New Kingdom began in 1550 BC with the Eighteenth Dynasty. These were the rulers who drove the Hyksos out of Egypt and their native city was Thebes, which then became the leading city in Egypt. They believed that their local deity, Amun, had guided them in their victory and the cult rose to national importance. Adjustments to the rituals and myths followed.

The title, God's Wife of Amun, "referred to the myth of the divine birth of the king, according to which his mother was impregnated by the god Amun." While the office theoretically, was sacred, it was essentially wielded as a political tool by the serving Egyptian pharaoh to ensure "royal authority over the Theban region and the powerful priesthood of Amun" there. The royal lineage was traced through its women, and the rulers and the religious institutions were inexorably woven together in traditions that remained quite stable over a period of three thousand years. This title was used in preference to the title, Great Royal Wife, which was the title of the queen who was the consort to the pharaoh and who officiated at the temple. The new title conveyed that the pharaoh would be a demigod upon birth. Previously the pharaoh was considered to become divine only at death.

The first royal wife to hold this new title (not to be mistaken with the title of God's Wife) was Queen Ahmose-Nefertari, the wife of Ahmose I, and this event is recorded in a stele in the temple of Amun at Karnak, and the role was a priestly post of importance in the temple of Amun in Thebes. She then passed it on to her daughter Ahmose-Meritamun, who in turn handed it to Hatshepsut, who used it before she ascended the throne as pharaoh.

Both Ahmose-Nefertari and Hatshepsut sometimes used the title as an alternative to that of "King's Principal Wife", which shows how important they felt the role was. Hatshepsut passed the title on to her daughter Neferure.

A series of scenes in Hatshepsut's Chapelle Rouge show the God's Wife of Amun (her daughter) and a male priest undergoing a ritual or ceremony that seems to be aimed at destroying the names of enemies. Other scenes elsewhere show the God's Wife of Amun worshiping the deities, being purified in the sacred lake, and following the king into the sanctuary. These again show the importance of the role, but give very little indication of the tasks and responsibilities involved.

Hatshepsut was the daughter of Thutmose I and, upon his death, she became the wife of the youthful Thutmose II who was her young half-brother, born to a lesser wife than her mother. She seems to have been a de facto co-regent with him, having a great deal of influence upon the affairs of state. They had only one child who survived childhood, a daughter, Neferure, to whom the title of God's Wife of Amun was passed.

Upon the death of her husband Thutmose II, Hatshepsut was appointed regent for the very youthful Thutmose III, who was not born to her—the royal wife and queen of his father—rather, he was born of a lesser wife. He was her stepson and nephew. Shortly thereafter, Hatshepsut was named pharaoh.

Her daughter, Neferure, took her place in many functions that required a royal queen serving as the Great Royal Wife and, as God's Wife of Amun in the temple, while Thutmose III remained as co-regent to Hatshepsut. He became the head of the armies.

Hatshepsut died after a 22-year reign and, Thutmose III became pharaoh. At the end of a thirty-year reign of his own, he entered into a co-regency with a son by a lesser wife who would become, Amenhotep II. Neferure had died without leaving another heir, but there were others in line to become pharaoh, so the co-regency assured that these royal offspring with closer ties to Hatshepsut would be removed from the line of descent, and Thutmose III's chosen heir would rule.

The records of holders of the title, God's Wife of Amun, after Thutmose III became pharaoh deviate from the established pattern, perhaps because of the line of royalty issue. After Neferure the list notes, Iset, the mother of Thutmose III, but it is quite certain that she never officiated, and was awarded the title after her death. Next is, Satiah, a lesser wife of Thutmose III in the early part of his reign. She is followed by Merytre-Hatshepsut, another lesser wife of Thutmose III, who became the mother of his ultimate heir. She was the daughter of the Divine Adoratrice of Amun, Huy. Next on the list is, Meritamen, a daughter of Thutmose III and Merytre-Hatshepsut, thereby the sister of his ultimate heir. After all of those changes during his long reign, the office holder was the daughter of Thutmose III, returning to the traditional association.

Amenhotep II seems to be the one who initiated the attempts to remove records of Hatshepsut's reign while his father was an old man and continued these efforts after he became pharaoh in his own right, claiming many of her achievements as his own, but failing to be thorough.

Amenhotep II also tried to break traditions by preventing the names of his wives from being recorded and introducing women who were not from the royal lineage into the line of descent—without success—as his designated heir was overlooked. After his death, which is estimated as 1400 BC, Thutmose IV was selected from the royal lineage as the next pharaoh.

The power and prestige of the role of the God's Wife of Amun was greatly diminished by Amenhotep II. He may have declined to have one, unless it remained as his sister, Meritamen. The woman listed as holding the office next is Tiaa. That is the name of a wife of his who was the mother of Thutmose IV and it is possible that she was named to this title by her son since he gave her other titles, however, the daughter of Thutmose IV also was named Tiaa.

Later in that dynasty, with religious changes affecting the status of the cult, the title then fell out of favour. The pharaoh Amenhotep IV, ruling from 1353 or 1351, initially followed the religious traditions. Soon he instituted a new religion that elevated Aten, not only to become the dominant cult, but as a monotheistic cult, suppressing the worship of others. The pharaoh changed his name to Akhenaten and moved his court to a new capital he had built, Akhetaten Horizon of Aten, at the site known today as Amarna. He and his royal wife, Nefertiti (whom he treated as a co-regent) became the intermediaries between Aten and the people. The worship of Amun was especially targeted for suppression and many of his temples were defaced and no idols were permitted. Aten became The Aten, represented only as a solar disk. Religious rituals were performed in open air settings.

The death of Akhenaten occurred circa 1336 BC and it was not long before the traditional religious practices began to resume. It is possible that Nefertiti ruled under another name and, perhaps, was an influence in the royal family until near the end of the rule of Tutankhamun (1333–1324 BC), but if she did, she did not prevent the revival. Tutankhamun began ruling as a child of nine under the name of Tutankhaten. Some think that he was the son of Akhenaten by a minor wife. During his reign his name was changed away from the deity of his father, replacing aten with amun. This marks the beginning of a transition back to Thebes as the capital as well.

The last ruler of the Eighteenth Dynasty, Horemheb (1320–1292 BC), restored the priesthood of Amun, but he prevented the Amun priesthood from resuming the powerful position they had held before Akhenaten dissolved the powerful cult and moved the capital away from their city. Horemheb had reformed the army and had developed a loyal chain of command within it. By appointing priests to the cult of Amun from the high ranks of his trusted army, he avoided any attempts to reestablish the powerful relationships that had provoked the drastic change made by Akhenaten.

=== Revival during dynasties Twenty through Twenty-six ===
The title, God's Wife of Amun, was revived during the Twentieth Dynasty, when Ramesses VI (1145–1137 BC) conferred this office as well as the additional title of Divine Adoratrice of Amun on his daughter, Iset; the king's actions inaugurated the tradition where every subsequent holder of this office had to be "a king's daughter, and was expected to remain an unmarried virgin. In order to assist [in] the royal succession, she would adopt the daughter of the next king as her heiress."

The office of the God's Wife of Amun reached the very heights of its political power during the late Third Intermediate Period, when Shepenupet I, Osorkon III's daughter, was first appointed to this post at Thebes. The Nubian king Kashta, in turn, appointed his daughter, Amenirdis, as her successor. The high status of this office is illustrated by the tomb of Amenirdis at Medinet Habu.

Later, during the Saite Twenty-sixth Dynasty, Psamtik I would forcibly reunite Egypt in March 656 BC under his rule and compel the God's Wife of Amun serving at the time, Shepenupet II, daughter of Piye, to adopt his daughter Nitocris as her chosen successor to this position.

=== Ending ===
The office continued in existence until 525 BC under Nitocris' successor, Ankhnesneferibre, when the Persian Empire overthrew Egypt's last Saite ruler, Psamtik III (526–525 BC), and enslaved his daughter. Thereafter, the powerful office of God's Wife of Amun disappears from history. It was not recreated by subsequent dynasties when Egypt regained it's independence from Persia.

== Royal women holding the office ==
Holders of the office from the tenth through the twelfth dynasties are not noted on this list because they were not women from the royal line.

Name	Tenure	Dynasty	Short summary
Ahhotep I	Unknown	17th Dynasty	Wife of Seqenenre Tao II and mother of Ahmose, the title God's Wife only appears on her coffin, first to hold this title.
Ahmose-Nefertari	Unknown	18th Dynasty	Daughter of Seqenenre Tao II and sister-wife of Ahmose – first royal woman known to hold the office.
Ahmose-Sitkamose	Posthumously	18th Dynasty	Probably a daughter of Kamose, may have become God's Wife only posthumously.
Ahmose-Meritamun	Unknown	18th Dynasty	Daughter of Ahmose and sister-wife of Amenhotep I.
Ahmose-Sitamun	Unknown	18th Dynasty	Daughter of Ahmose, represented as a colossal statue in front of the eight pylon at Karnak.
Hatshepsut	Unknown	18th Dynasty	Daughter of Tuthmosis I and Queen Ahmose, given title of Divine Adoratrice of Amun also, became pharaoh.
Neferure	Unknown	18th Dynasty	Daughter of Tuthmosis II and Queen-Pharaoh Hatshepsut, possibly first royal wife of Tuthmosis III
Iset	Posthumously	18th Dynasty	Mother of Tuthmosis III, received the title of God's Wife after her death.
Satiah	Unknown	18th Dynasty	Next wife of Tuthmosis III in the early part of his reign.
Merytre-Hatshepsut	Unknown	18th Dynasty	Next wife of Tuthmosis III, mother of his heir, she was the daughter of the Divine Adoratrice of Amun Hui.
Meritamen	Unknown	18th Dynasty	Daughter of Tuthmosis III and Merytre-Hatshepsut.
Tiaa	Unknown	18th Dynasty	Wife of Amenhotep II and mother of Tuthmosis IV.
Hiatus due to political and religious changes that occurred and reverted again
Sitre	Unknown	19th Dynasty	Wife of Ramesses I, mother of Seti I, use of the title resumes after hiatus imposed by Amenhotep II.
(Mut-)Tuy	Unknown	19th Dynasty	Wife of Seti I and mother of Ramesses II.
Tausret	Unknown	19th Dynasty	Wife of Seti II, regent for Siptah.
Iset Ta-Hemdjert	Unknown	20th Dynasty	Wife of Ramesses III.
Tyti	Unknown	20th Dynasty	Wife (and daughter) of Ramesses III.
Duatentopet	Unknown	20th Dynasty	Wife of Ramesses IV, she was a Divine Adoratrice of Amun.
Aset	Unknown	20th Dynasty	Daughter of Ramesses VI, also given title of Divine Adoratrice of Amun.
Maatkare Mutemhat	Unknown	21st Dynasty	Daughter of Pinudjem I and Henuttawy Q
Henuttawy	Unknown	21st Dynasty	Daughter of Isetemkheb IV and Pinudjem II
Karomama Meritmut	Unknown	22nd Dynasty	Possibly a daughter of Osorkon II.
Shepenwepet I	Unknown	23rd Dynasty	Daughter of Osorkon III and Karoatjet, served as God's Wife of Amun from the beginning of her father's reign, and adopted Amenirdis I.
Amenirdis I	714–700 BC	25th Dynasty	Daughter of Kashta, served through the reigns of Shabaka and Shabataka.
Shepenupet II	700–650 BC	25th Dynasty	Daughter of Piye, served as God's Wife from the reign of Taharqa until after year 9 of Psamtik I.
Amenirdis II	650–640 BC	26th Dynasty	Daughter of Taharqa, adopted by Shepenwepet II, may have been passed over after the death of Shepenwepet II to have the position go to Nitokris.
Nitokris I	655–585 BC	26th Dynasty	Daughter of Psamtik I.
Ankhnesneferibre	595–525 BC	26th Dynasty	Ankhnesneferibre is the daughter of Psamtik II, and was the last woman to hold the title "God's Wife" before the Achaemenid conquest of Egypt.

== See also ==
- Divine Adoratrice of Amun
- List of pharaohs deified during lifetime
