= Book of Nahum =

Book of the Bible

The Book of Nahum is the seventh book of the 12 minor prophets of the Hebrew Bible. The book has three chapters. It is attributed to the prophet Nahum (/ˈneɪ.(h)əm/). The most general historical setting of Nahum as a prophet was 663–612 BC, while the historical setting that produced the book of Nahum is debated, with proposed timeframes ranging from shortly after the fall of Thebes in 663 BC to the Maccabean period around 175–165 BC. Another view, held by the ancient historian Josephus, proposes that the book of Nahum was from the reign of Jotham. This identification is supported by both the Greek Septuagint and the Latin Vulgate, both of which refer to Thebes in the present tense rather than the past tense. Its principal theme is the destruction of the Assyrian city of Nineveh.

== Background ==
Scholars with a preference for Hebrew manuscripts place the writing of the book after the Assyrian king Ashurbanipal's Sack of Thebes in 663 BC. This view is the current majority opinion because the city of Thebes is referred to in the past tense in the Masoretic Text of Nahum 3:8-10. However, both the Septuagint and Vulgate refer to the city in the present tense, and the former opinion held by scholars was that Nahum lived about a century earlier, before both the captivity of the ten lost tribes and the Sack of Thebes.

The first-century Jewish historian Flavius Josephus places Nahum's life during the reign of Jotham. This view was also held by the Catholic scholar Thomas Worthington in his notes for the original Douay-Rheims Bible, writing: "Nahum prophesied about 50 years after Jonah ... 135 before the destruction of Niniveh." In this view, rather than Ashurbanipal, Nahum's prophecy would have been directed at Tiglath-Pileser III, who revitalized the Neo-Assyrian Empire into a world power again and conquered most of the Levant, defeating and subjugating previously influential kingdoms, including Aram-Damascus. Tiglath-Pileser was contemporary with the reign of Jotham.

Some scholars hold that "the book of the vision" was written at the time of the fall of Nineveh, at the hands of the Medes and Babylonians in 612 BC. possibly around 615 BC, before the downfall of Assyria. For those who do not believe in the validity of prophecy, the oracles must be dated after the Assyrian destruction of Thebes, Egypt in 663 BC, as this event is mentioned in Nahum 3:8.

=== Author ===
Little is known about Nahum's personal history. His name means "comfort", and he came from the town of Elkosh or Alqosh (Nahum 1:1), which scholars have attempted to identify with several cities, including the modern `Alqush of Assyria and Capernaum of northern Galilee. He was a very nationalistic Hebrew, and lived among the Elkoshites in peace.

=== Historical context ===
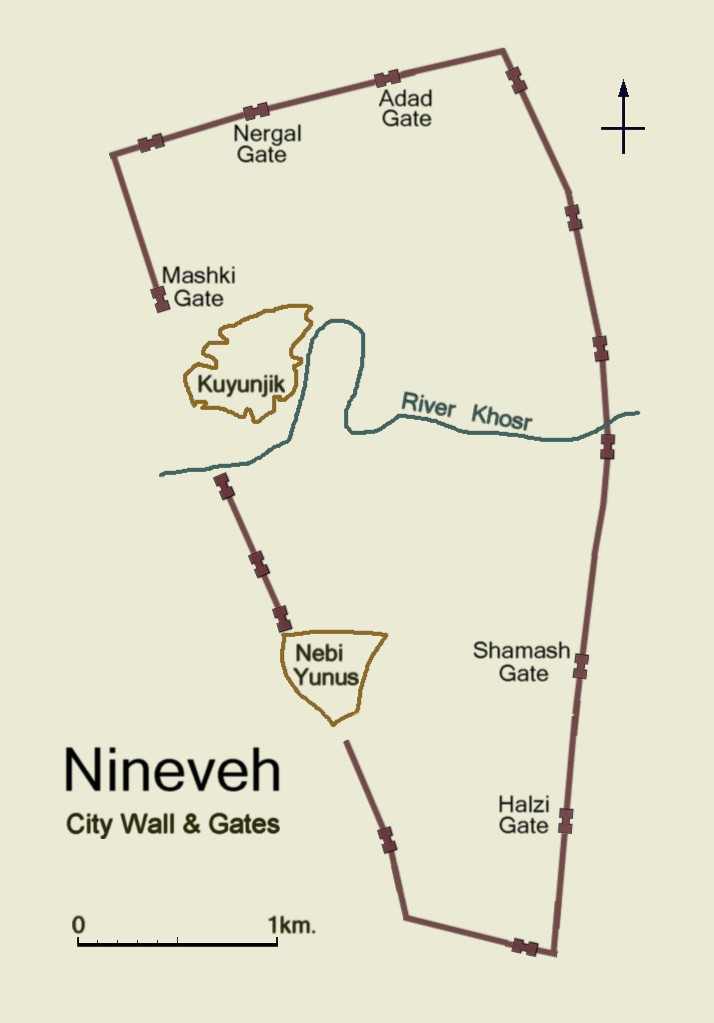
Simplified plan of ancient Nineveh, showing city wall and location of gateways.

The subject of Nahum's prophecy is the approaching complete and final destruction of Nineveh, which was the capital of the great and flourishing Assyrian empire at that time. Ashurbanipal was at the height of his glory. Nineveh was a city of vast extent, and was then the center of the civilization and commerce of the world, according to Nahum a "bloody city all full of lies and robbery", a reference to the Neo-Assyrian Empire's military campaigns and demand of tribute and plunder from conquered cities.

Jonah had already uttered his message of warning, and Nahum was followed by Zephaniah, who also predicted the destruction of the city.

Nineveh was destroyed apparently by fire around 625 BC, and the Assyrian empire came to an end, an event which changed the face of Asia. Archaeological digs have uncovered the splendor of Nineveh in its zenith under Sennacherib (705–681 BC), Esarhaddon (681–669 BC), and Ashurbanipal (669–633 BC). Massive walls were eight miles in circumference. It had a water aqueduct, palaces and a library with 20,000 clay tablets, including accounts of a creation in Enuma Elish and a flood in the Epic of Gilgamesh.

The Babylonian chronicle of the fall of Nineveh tells the story of the end of Nineveh. Nabopolassar of Babylon joined forces with Cyaxares, king of the Medes, and laid siege for three months.

Assyria lasted a few more years after the loss of its fortress, but attempts by Egyptian Pharaoh Necho II to rally the Assyrians failed due to opposition from king Josiah of Judah, and it seemed to be all over by 609 BC.

== Overview ==
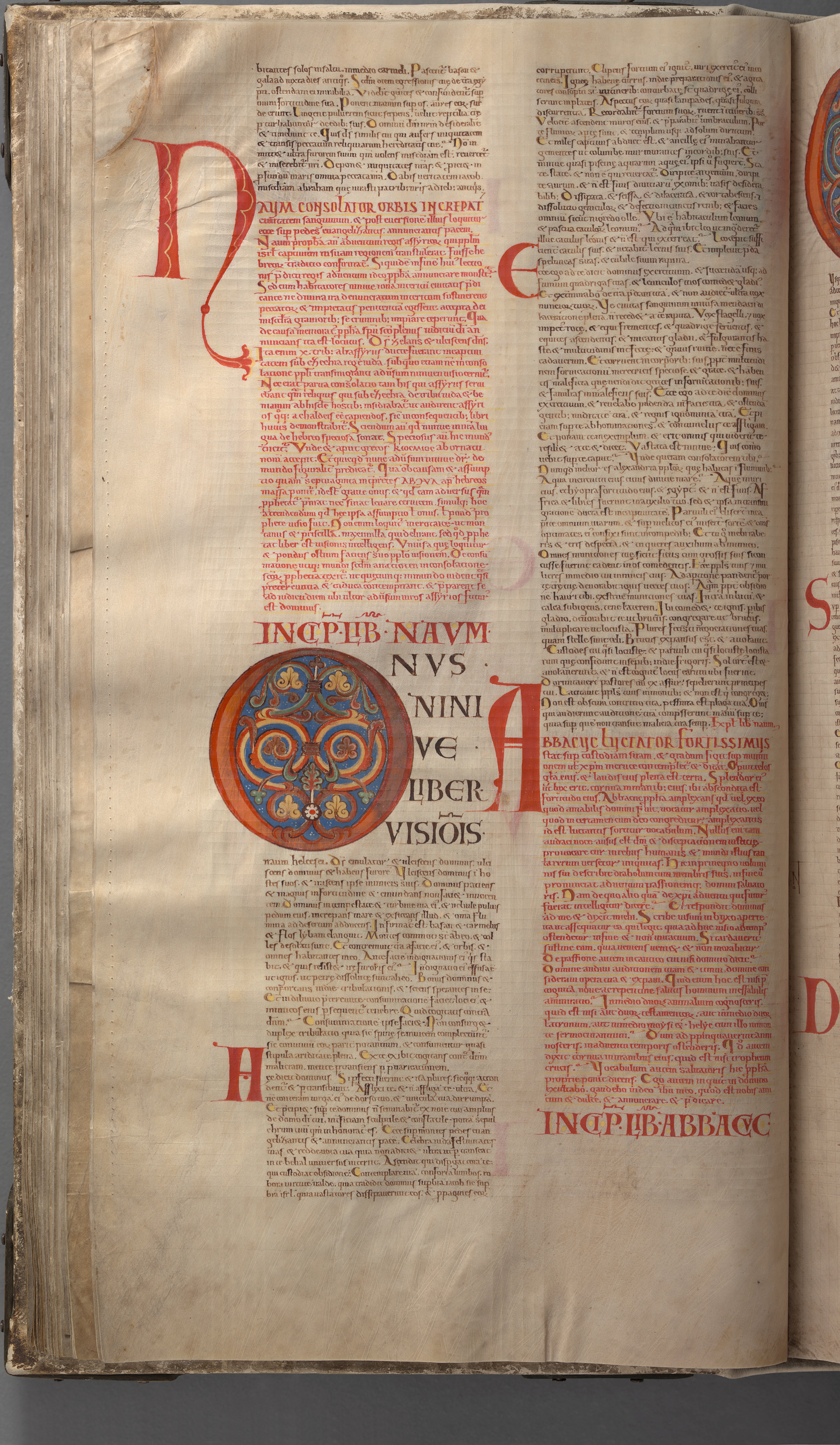
The whole Book of Nahum in Latin as a part of Codex Gigas, made around the 13th century.

Beyond its superscription, Nahum 1:1, the Book of Nahum consists of two parts: a prelude in chapter one, followed by chapters two and three, which describe the fall of Nineveh, which later took place in 612 BC. Davidson notes that there are two parts to the superscription:

- The burden of Nineveh, or "an oracle against Nineveh", probably an editorial addition, and
- The book of the vision of Nahum the Elkoshite, which "may ... have come from the hand of the prophet himself".

Nineveh is compared to Thebes, the Egyptian city that Assyria itself had destroyed in 663 BC. Nahum describes the siege and frenzied activity of Nineveh's troops as they try in vain to halt the invaders. Poetically, he becomes a participant in the battle, and with subtle irony, barks battle commands to the defenders. Nahum uses numerous similes and metaphor that Nineveh will become weak "like the lion hiding in its den". It concludes with a taunt song and funeral dirge of the impending destruction of Nineveh and the "sleep" or death of the Assyrian people and demise of the once great Assyrian conqueror-rulers.

== Surviving early manuscripts ==
The original text was written in Biblical Hebrew.

Some early manuscripts containing the text of this chapter in Hebrew are the Masoretic Text, which includes the Codex Cairensis (895), Aleppo Codex (10th century), and Codex Leningradensis (1008).

Fragments of this book were found among the Dead Sea Scrolls including 4QpNah, known as the "Nahum Commentary" (1st century BC); 4Q82 (4QXII^{g}; 1st century BC). and Wadi Murabba'at MurXII (1st century AD).

There is also a translation into Koine Greek known as the Septuagint, made in the last few centuries BC, with extant manuscripts including Codex Vaticanus (B; $\mathfrak{G}$^{B}; 4th century), Codex Sinaiticus (S; BHK: $\mathfrak{G}$^{S}; 4th century), Codex Alexandrinus (A; $\mathfrak{G}$^{A}; 5th century) and Codex Marchalianus (Q; $\mathfrak{G}$^{Q}; 6th century). Some fragments containing parts of this chapter (a revision of the Septuagint) were found among the Dead Sea Scrolls, i.e., Naḥal Ḥever (8ḤevXII^{gr}; 1st century AD).

== Themes ==
=== The fall of Nineveh ===
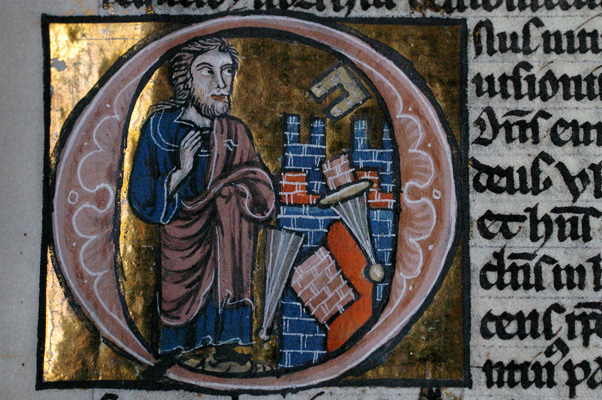
Nahum and the destruction of Nineveh; Illuminated Bible from the 1220s, National Library of Portugal

Nahum's prophecy carries a particular warning to the Ninevites of coming events, although he is partly in favor of the destruction. One might even say that the book of Nahum is "a celebration of the fall of Assyria". And this is not just a warning or speaking positively of the destruction of Nineveh, it is also a positive encouragement and "message of comfort for Israel, Judah, and others who had experienced the 'endless cruelty' of the Assyrians."

The prophet Jonah shows us where God shows concern for the people of Nineveh, while Nahum's writing testifies to his belief in the righteousness/justice of God and how God dealt with those Assyrians in punishment according to "their cruelty". The Assyrians had been used as God's "rod of [...] anger, and the staff in their hand [as] indignation."

=== The nature of God ===
From its opening, Nahum affirms God to be slow to anger, but that God will by no means ignore the guilty; God will bring his vengeance and wrath to pass. God is presented as a God who will punish evil, but will protect those who trust in Him. The opening passage states: "God is jealous, and the LORD revengeth; the LORD revengeth, and is furious; the LORD will take vengeance on his adversaries, and he reserveth wrath for his enemies. The LORD is slow to anger, and great in power, and will not at all acquit the wicked".

"The LORD is slow to anger but great in power; the LORD will not leave the guilty unpunished."

"The LORD is good, a refuge in times of trouble. He cares for those who trust in him."

== Importance ==
God's judgement on Nineveh is "all because of the wanton lust of a harlot, alluring, the mistress of sorceries, who enslaved nations by her prostitution and peoples by her witchcraft." Infidelity, according to the prophets, related to spiritual unfaithfulness. For example: "the land is guilty of the vilest adultery in departing from the LORD." John of Patmos used a similar analogy in Revelation chapter 17.

The prophecy of Nahum was referenced in the deuterocanonical Book of Tobit. In Tobit 14:4 (NRSV) a dying Tobit says to his son Tobias and Tobias' sons:

[My son] hurry off to Media, for I believe the word of God that Nahum spoke about Nineveh, that all these things will take place and overtake Assyria and Nineveh. Indeed, everything that was spoken by the prophets of Israel, whom God sent, will occur.

However, some versions, such as the King James Version, refer to the prophet Jonah instead.

== See also ==
- Rape in the Hebrew Bible § Nahum 3

== Sources ==
- Fitzmyer, Joseph A. (2008). A Guide to the Dead Sea Scrolls and Related Literature. Grand Rapids, MI: William B. Eerdmans Publishing Company. ISBN 978-0-8028-6241-9.
- Würthwein, Ernst (1995). The Text of the Old Testament. Translated by Rhodes, Erroll F. Grand Rapids, MI: Wm. B. Eerdmans. ISBN 0-8028-0788-7.

Book of Nahum Minor prophets
| Preceded by Micah | Hebrew Bible | Succeeded by Habakkuk |
| Preceded by Micah | Christian; Old Testament | Succeeded by Habakkuk |
