= Iset (priestess) =

- God's Wife of Amun; Divine Adoratrice of Amun
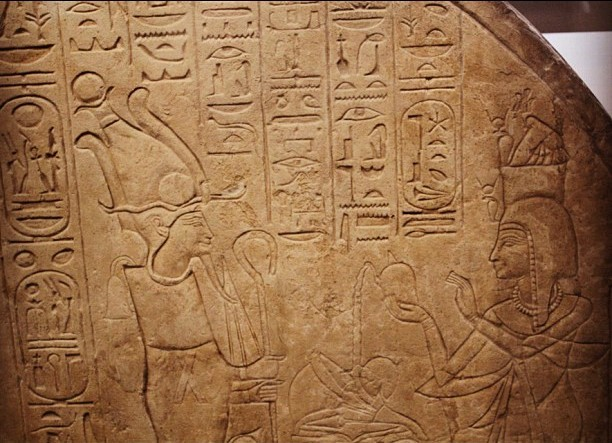
- Iset (right) on a stela from Coptos. Manchester Museum, inv. 1781
Egyptian name
st t H8 B1 M2
- Dynasty: 20th Dynasty of Egypt
- Died: Thebes?
- Father: Ramesses VI
- Mother: Nubkhesbed

Iset (Aset, Isis) (Ancient Egyptian: 3s.t) was an ancient Egyptian princess and God's Wife of Amun during the 20th Dynasty.

Iset was the daughter of Pharaoh Ramesses VI and his Great Royal Wife Nubkhesbed, and a sister to Pharaoh Ramesses VII.

She was the first to hold the revived titles of God's Wife of Amun and Divine Adoratrice of Amun, both of which had been of great importance during the early 18th Dynasty but fell into disuse later. From her time on, the position of God's Wife became more and more influential, reaching the peak of its power during the Third Intermediate Period. Iset was probably the first God's Wife of Amun to live in celibacy (the previous holders of the title were queens, usually Great Royal Wives).

She is depicted on a stela in Coptos (today in the Manchester Museum, inv. no. 1781). Her installation as God's Wife is shown on a block from Dra' Abu el-Naga'. Her name is written in a cartouche along with the title Divine Adoratrix.
