= Mehytenweskhet =

- Great Royal Wife; Queen consort of Egypt
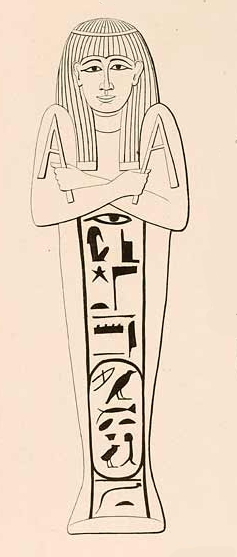
- Ushabti of Mehytenweskhet
- Burial: Medinet Habu, Thebes
- Spouse: Psamtik I
- Issue: Necho II, Nitocris I, Meryetneith
- Dynasty: 26th Dynasty
- Father: Harsiese

V22 t H8 n O15
Mehytenweskhet
in hieroglyphs
Era: Late Period
(664–332 BC)

Mehytenweskhet or Mehtenweskhet was the daughter of the High Priest of Ra Harsiese, and the Great Royal Wife of Psamtik I. She dates to the Twenty-sixth Dynasty of Egypt.

== Biography ==
Mehytenweskhet was the daughter of the High Priest of Re Harsiese. It has been suggested that the high priest Harsiese is identical to the Vizier Harsiese who may have served Taharqa. If so, Harsiese would have served as vizier to Taharqa, while opening up relations with Necho I while the latter was ruler of Sais. This may have allowed Harsiese to remain in office as vizier into the reign of his son-in-law Psamtik I. If the Vizier Harsiese was Mehytenweskhet's father, she would have been a sister of Naneferhenes, who was married to a Theban priest named Nesamun.

Mehytenweskhet was the mother of Necho II, the Divine Adoratrice of Amun Nitocris I and a daughter named Meryetneith. Mehytenweskhet was buried with her daughter Nitocris in Medinet Habu.
