= Divine Adoratrice of Amun =

Ancient Egyptian title for certain high-ranking priestesses

R8 dwA t N35 M17 Y5 N35
dwꜣt nṯr n ỉmn
Duatnetjer-en-Amun
in hieroglyphs
Era: 3rd Intermediate Period
(1069–664 BC)

nTr dwA t
dw3.t nṯr – Duatnetjer
Divine Adoratrice (short form)
in hieroglyphs
Era: 3rd Intermediate Period
(1069–664 BC)

The Divine Adoratrice of Amun (Egyptian: dwꜣt nṯr n jmn) was a second title – after God's Wife of Amun – created for the chief priestess of the ancient Egyptian deity Amun. During the first millennium BCE, when the holder of this office exercised her largest measure of influence, her position was an important appointment facilitating the transfer of power from one pharaoh to the next, when his daughter was adopted to fill it by the incumbent office holder. The Divine Adoratrice ruled over the extensive temple duties and domains, controlling a significant part of the ancient Egyptian economy.

== History ==
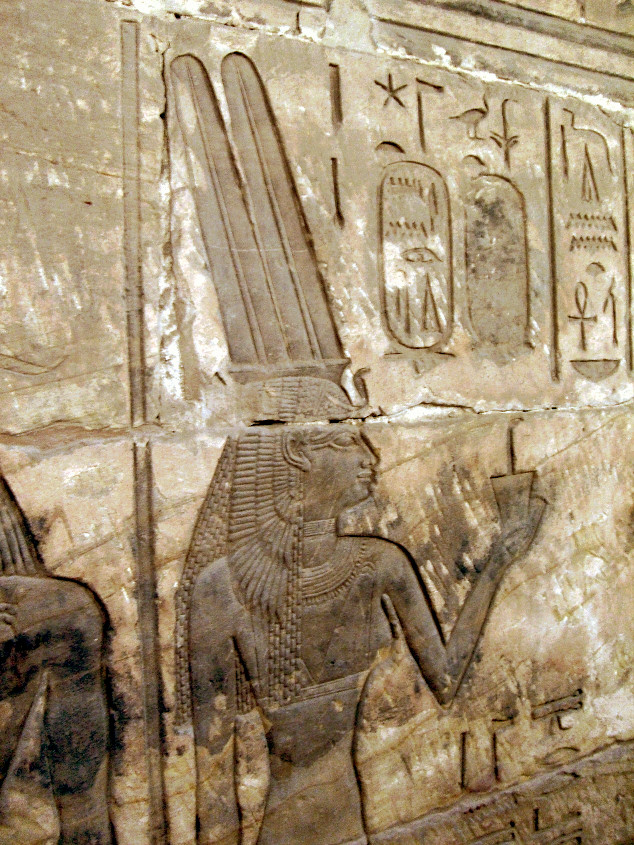
The Divine Adoratrice Amenirdis I at Medinet Habu

God's Wife of Amun, a title for a similar office of the high priestess, originated as a title held by a daughter of the High Priest of Amun during the reign of Hatshepsut and continued as an important office while the capital of Egypt remained in Thebes.

Later, the added title Divine Adoratrice of Amun can be seen to accompany a resurgence of the title God's Wife of Amun, which had fallen into disuse. The God's Wife title was revived during the Twentieth Dynasty, when Ramesses VI's daughter Iset held the office, as well as the additional office of Divine Adoratrice. He reigned from 1145 to 1137 BC. She never married and seems to have been the first of the celibate holders of the office of Divine Adoratrice of Amun, as he stipulated along with the new tradition that she would adopt the daughter of the succeeding pharaoh as her successor at the end of his reign in order to facilitate the transition to the next pharaoh. Generally, the tradition was followed and the position was filled by the daughter of the current king, who was adopted as the daughter of the incumbent Divine Adoratrice.

The new office reached the very heights of its political power during the late Third Intermediate Period of Egypt when Shepenupet I, Osorkon III's daughter, was first appointed to this post at Thebes. The Nubian king Kashta, in turn, appointed his daughter, Amenirdis, as her successor. The high status of this office is illustrated by the tomb of Amenirdis at Medinet Habu.[4]

Toward the end of the Third Intermediate Perion the Napatan kings from Kingdom of Kush, who reigned as the Twenty-fifth Dynasty of Egypt, spread their realm into Upper Egypt. The reigning God's Wife of Amun, Shepenupet I, was persuaded to adopt Amenirdis, the daughter of Pharaoh Kashta of Kush as her heir. This sequence was followed throughout the 25th Dynasty until Egypt was conquered by the Saite king Psamtik I, who founded the Twenty-sixth Dynasty, who had his daughter, Nitocris I, adopted by Amenirdis II. The Adoption Stela of Nitocris shows the ceremony involved by this event, and the prestige of the role.

I have given to him my daughter to be a god's wife and have endowed her better than those who were before her. Surely he will be gratified with her worship and protect the land who gave her to him.

At this time, the dynastic rulers were based in the Nile Delta region, and the office of the Divine Adoratrice was a means to secure peaceful relations with the Theban area where the cult of Amun was centered. A number of the God's Wives had mortuary shrines constructed on the west bank of the river, mostly alongside the mortuary temple at Medinet Habu of Ramesses III.

Because of the power and prestige of the offices, the ceremony of adoption by the current incumbent of the post was used as a way for the kings of the Delta area to project their power into the south of Egypt. In the same manner, it was used by the Napatan kings to project their power northward into Egypt proper. The power of the Divine Adoratrice of Amun was limited to the area around Thebes in Upper Egypt, which was the center of the cult.

Divine Adoratrice of Amun
Name	Comments	Dates
Shepenupet I	Daughter of Osorkon III	754–714 BCE
Amenirdis I	Daughter of Kashta, sister of Piye	740–720 BCE
Shepenupet II	Daughter of Piye, sister of Taharqa	710–650 BCE
Amenirdis II	Daughter of Taharqa	670–640 BCE
Nitocris I	Daughter of Psamtik I	656–586 BCE
Ankhnesneferibre	Daughter of Psamtik II, great-niece of Nitocris I	595–c.525 BCE
Nitocris II	Daughter of Amasis II; office was abolished in 525 due to the Persian conquest	?–525 BCE

== See also ==
- Clergy of ancient Egypt
- High Priest of Amun
