= Nitocris I (Divine Adoratrice) =

- God's Wife of Amun; Divine Adoratrice of Amun
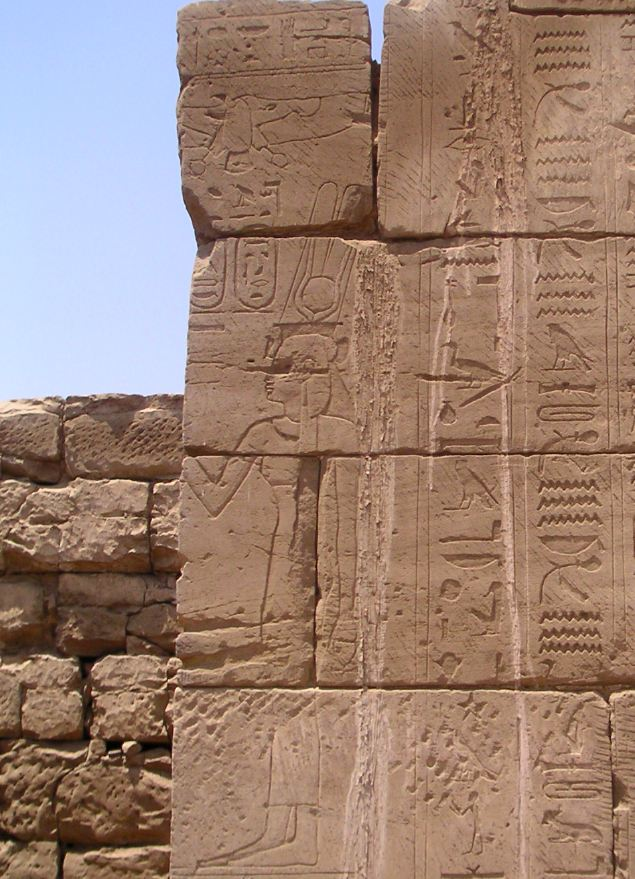
- Relief of the Divine Adoratice Nitocris I from her Karnak chapel
Egyptian name
Royal titulary
Horus name
t G36 r
Weret
wrt
The great one
Prenomen
< t G14 nb nfr nfr nfr >
Nebetneferumut
nb(t)-nfrw-Mwt
Mistress of the beauties of Mut
Nomen
< t G14 N36 R24 t i N29 r t >
Nitiqret Meritmut
Nt-jqrt mrj(t)-Mwt
Nitiqret, beloved of Mut
- Tenure: 655–585 BC
- Predecessor: Shepenupet II (as God's Wife); Amenirdis II (as Divine Adoratrice)
- Successor: Ankhnesneferibre
- Dynasty: 26th Dynasty
- Died: 585 BC
- Burial: Medinet Habu
- Father: Psamtik I
- Mother: Mehytenweskhet C

Nitocris I (alt. Nitiqret, Nitokris I) (died 585 BC) served as the heir to, and then, as the Divine Adoratrice of Amun or God's Wife of Amun for a period of more than seventy years, between 655 BC and 585 BC.

== Biography ==
She was the daughter of the 26th Dynasty pharaoh, Psamtik I, by his queen Mehytenweskhet. Early in his reign, in March 656 BC, Psamtik I dispatched a powerful naval fleet to Thebes and compelled the then serving God's Wife of Amun, Shepenupet II, a daughter of Piye, to adopt Nitocris as her heir to this powerful office. The ceremony of the adoption and elevation of Nitocris I is commemorated in the well known Adoption Stela. It is not known at what date she assumed the office of Divine Adoratrice of Amun, but she served in this position until Year 4 of Apries in 585 BC. Prior to her career in this office, the Assyrians had invaded Egypt in 671 BC, sacked Thebes, and robbed its temples of their many treasures. The reunification of Egypt by her father was facilitated by her rise.

When she was in her eighties, she adopted her great-niece Ankhnesneferibre, the daughter of Psamtik II, continuing the succession in her family line.

During her tenure, she was attested by several building works around Karnak, Luxor, and Abydos. She was buried in the grounds of Medinet Habu, in a tomb chapel that "she shared with her natural mother and adoptive grandmother." Her sarcophagus was reused in a Ptolemaic tomb at Deir el-Medina, and today, is located in the Cairo Museum.

== The Adoption Stela ==
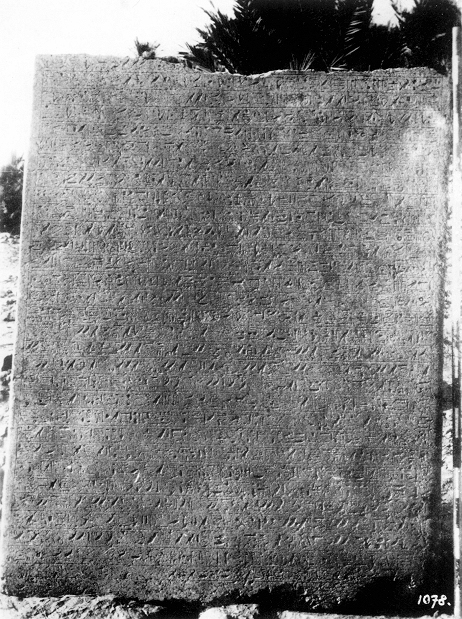
Nitocris adoption stela, shortly after discovery in Karnak in 1897

A stela often referred to as the "Adoption Stela", was unearthed in 1897 by Georges Legrain at Karnak and moved to the Cairo Museum. It is made from red granite and measures roughly 6 ft (1.8 m) in height and 4.5 ft (1.4 m) in width.

The beginning of the inscription is lost, but the remainder continues with an inscription relating that Pharaoh Psamtik I is reporting to the court his intention to give his daughter to Amun to be a God's Wife. Psamtik acknowledged that the current God's Wife, Shepenupet II, daughter of pharaoh Piye of the 25th Dynasty, already had an heir in Taharqa's daughter Amenirdis II, who was officiating as Divine Adoratrice of Amun. Psamtik intended to compel Shepenupet to adopt Nitocris as her heir, thus supplanting Amenirdis II in the succession.

The court praised the pharaoh's decision and, in his regnal “year 9, first month of the first season, day 28” (a date identified with March 2, 656 BC) Nitocris departed from Sais to Thebes on a royal flotilla led by the admiral and nomarch of Herakleopolis Magna, Sematawytefnakht.

After sixteen days the flotilla reached Thebes, whose population acclaimed the arrival of the princess. Both Shepenupet II and Amenirdis II met Nitocris. She was adopted formally and both agreed to convey their properties to her (and, indirectly, to Psamtik I).

Then the stela reports a very detailed list with all the daily donations (mainly food) to Nitocris from several officials such as the mayor of Thebes, Mentuemhat, and his family, from the priesthood of Amun that at this time was led by the High Priest of Amun, Harkhebi, as well as from the king and many temples of the whole Land.

=== Importance ===
Shepenupet II and Amenirdis II were the last vestiges of the vanished 25th Dynasty, yet they held this highest position of power in the south and practically controlled the entirety of Upper Egypt. Psamtik I chose not to remove the God's Wife in charge forcefully – an action that would be unpopular – but to make her adopt his daughter as her successor, thus ensuring the future control of Upper Egypt, as well as receiving a considerable number of properties and other goods: beyond the "facade" of the adoption of Nitocris, the stela de facto reports the reunification of Upper and Lower Egypt under the aegis of Psamtik.

== Ancestry ==
Ancestors of Nitocris I (Divine Adoratrice)

8. King Tefnakht II of Sais
4. King Necho I of Sais
2. Pharaoh Psamtik I
5. Queen Istemabet
1. Nitocris I
6. Harsiese, High Priest of Ra
3. Queen Mehytenweskhet

Preceded by Shepenupet II	God's Wife of Amun; 655–585 BC	Succeeded by Ankhnesneferibre
Preceded by Amenirdis II	Divine Adoratrice of Amun; 656–586 BC	Succeeded by Ankhnesneferibre
