= Shepenupet II =

- Divine Adoratrice of Amun; God's Wife of Amun
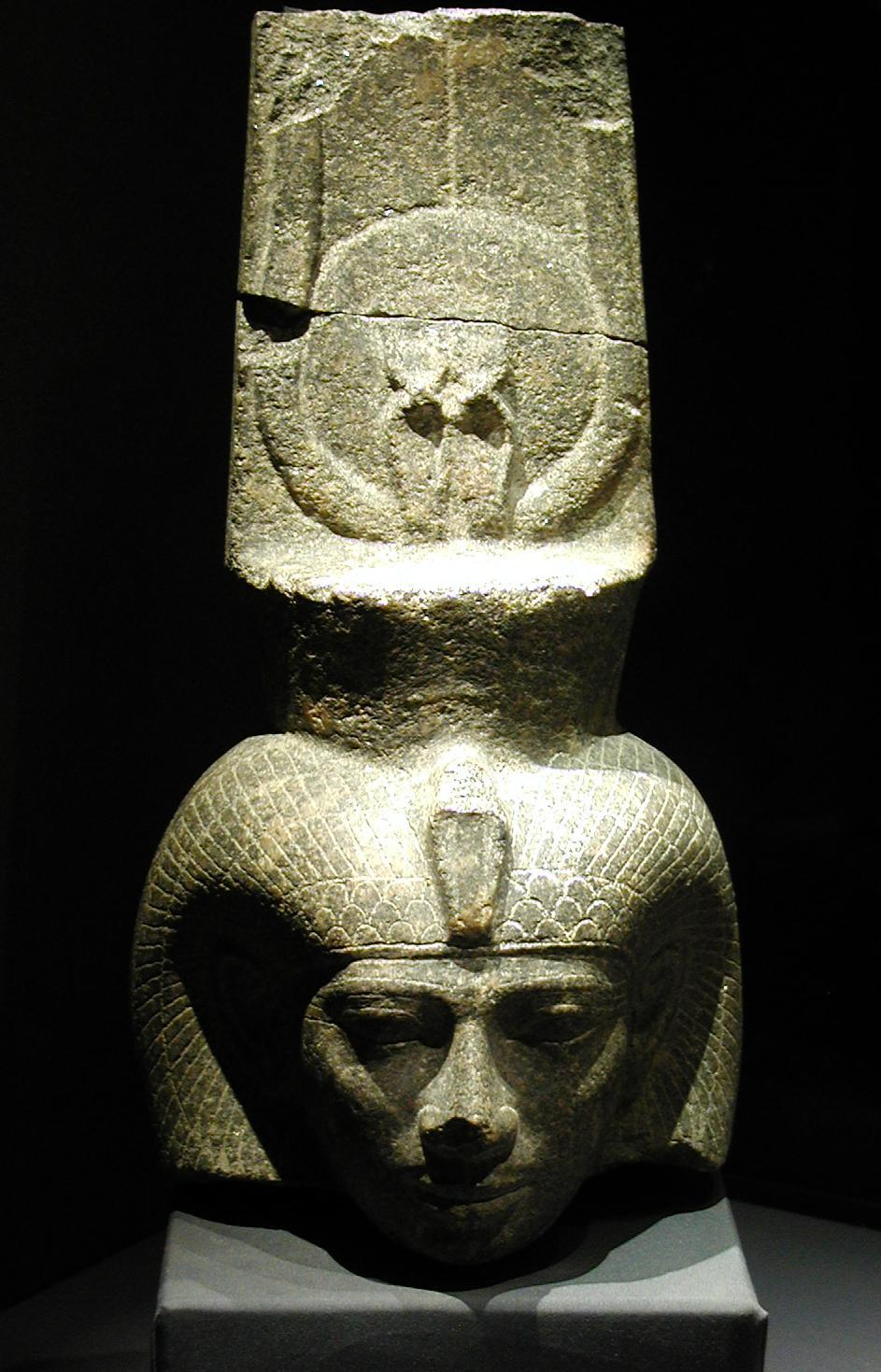
- Head of Shepenupet II from Alexandria National Museum, Egypt
Egyptian name
Royal titulary
Prenomen
< G14 D4 N5 W10 t nfr nfr nfr >
Henutneferumut Irietre
ẖnwt-nfrw-Mwt Jrt-Rˁ
Nomen
< N37 p Z9 n F13 p Z9 >
Shepenupet
šp-(n)-Wpt
- Tenure: c. 700–650 BC
- Predecessor: Amenirdis I
- Successor: Amenirdis II (as Divine Adoratrice); Nitocris I (as God's Wife)
- Dynasty: 25th Dynasty
- Burial: Medinet Habu
- Father: Piye

Shepenupet II (alt. Shepenwepet II, prenomen: Henutneferumut Irietre) was an ancient Egyptian princess of the 25th Dynasty who served as the high priestess, the Divine Adoratrice of Amun, from around 700 BC to 650 BC. She was the daughter of the first Kushite pharaoh Piye and sister of Piye's successors, Shabaka and Taharqa.

== Biography ==
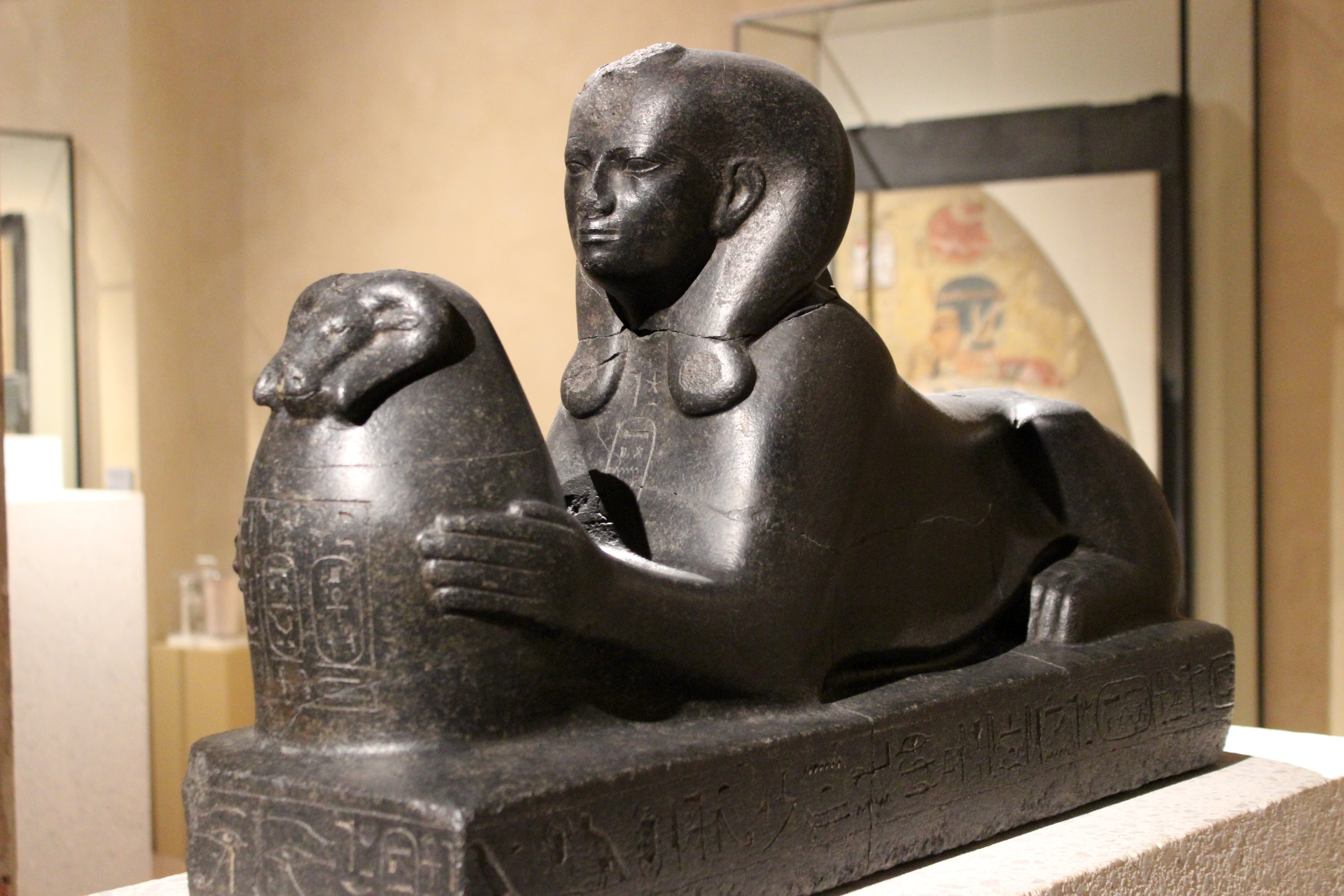
Granite sphinx of Shepenupet II in the Neues Museum of Berlin

Shepenupet II was adopted by her predecessor in office, Amenirdis I, a sister of Piye. Shepenupet was God's Wife of Amun from the beginning of Taharqa's reign until Year 9 of Pharaoh Psamtik I. While in office she had to come to a power sharing arrangement with the mayor of Thebes, Mentuemhat.

Her niece, Amenirdis, the daughter of Taharqa, was appointed as her heiress. Shepenupet was compelled to adopt Nitocris, daughter of pharaoh Psamtik I, who reunited Egypt after the Assyrian conquest. This is evidenced by the so-called Adoption Stela of Nitocris. In 656 BC, in Year 9 of the reign of Psamtik I, she received Nitocris at Thebes.

Her tomb is located in the grounds of Medinet Habu on the west bank of the Nile at Thebes. She was succeeded as Divine Adoratrice by Amenirdis II, who was succeeded by Nitocris I.

== Images ==
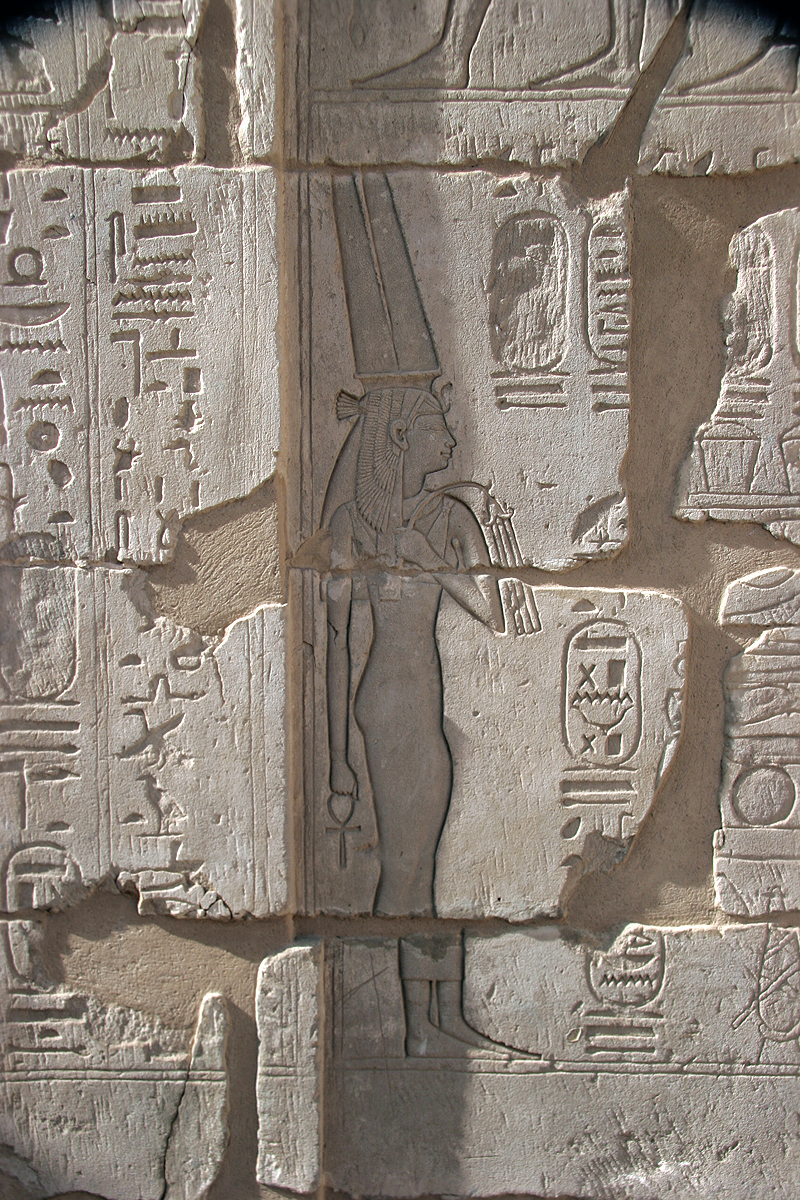
Shepenupet II at Medinet Habu

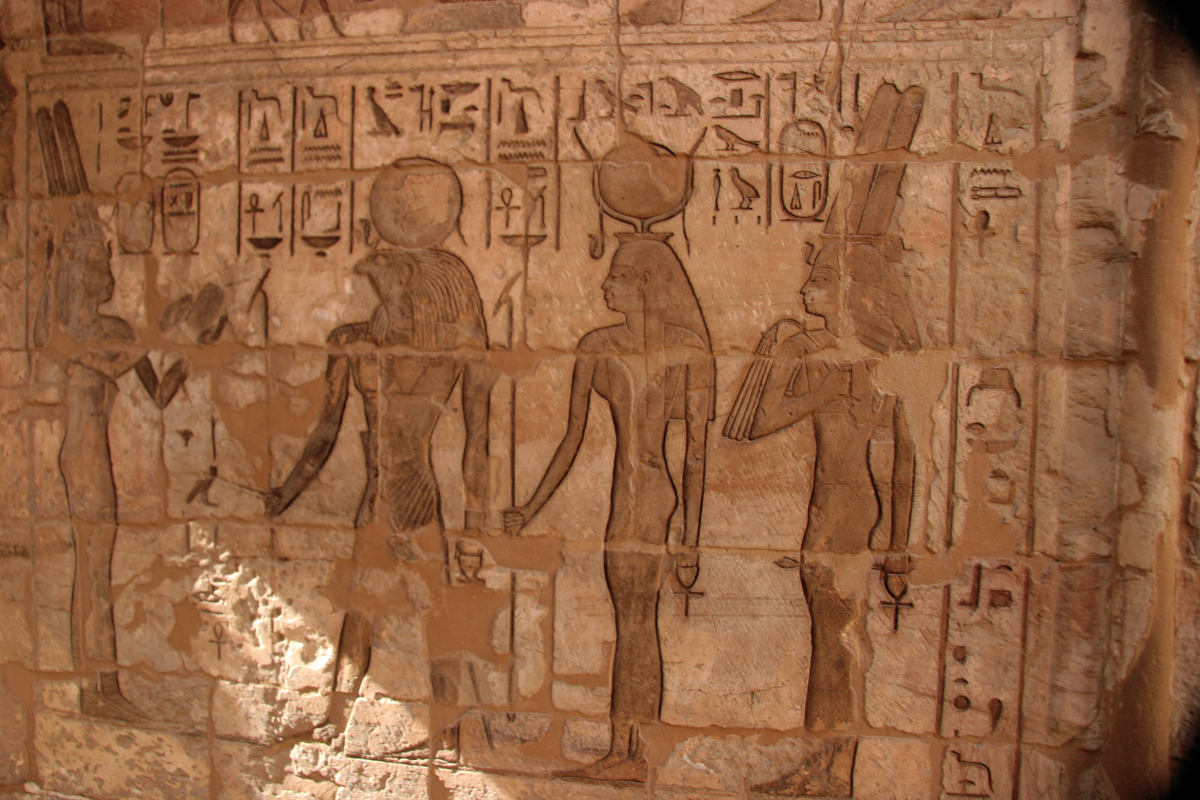
Shepenupet II and Amenirdis II at Medinet Habu

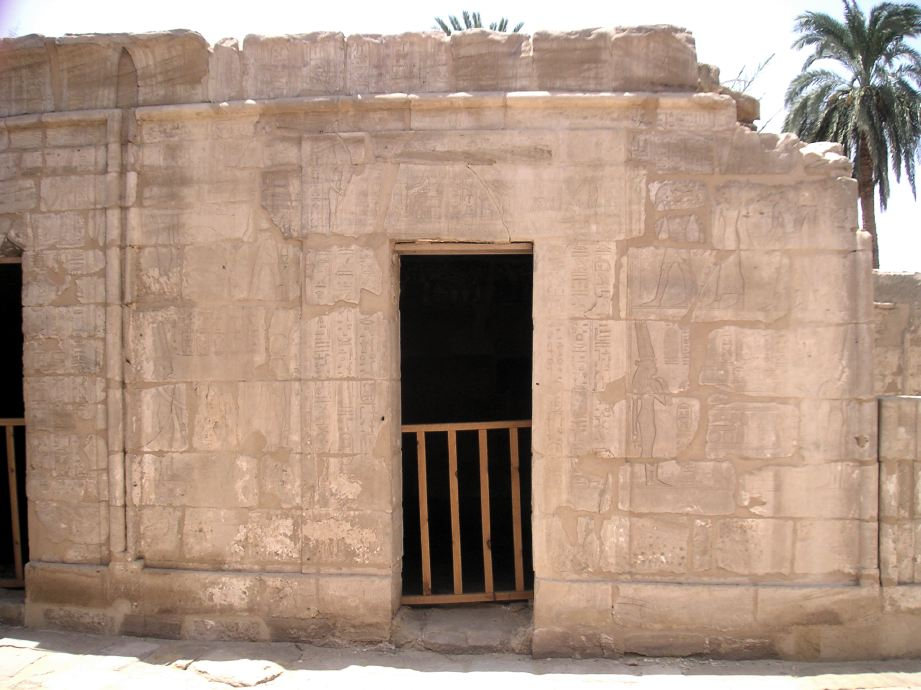
Chapel of Shepenupet at Medinet Habu

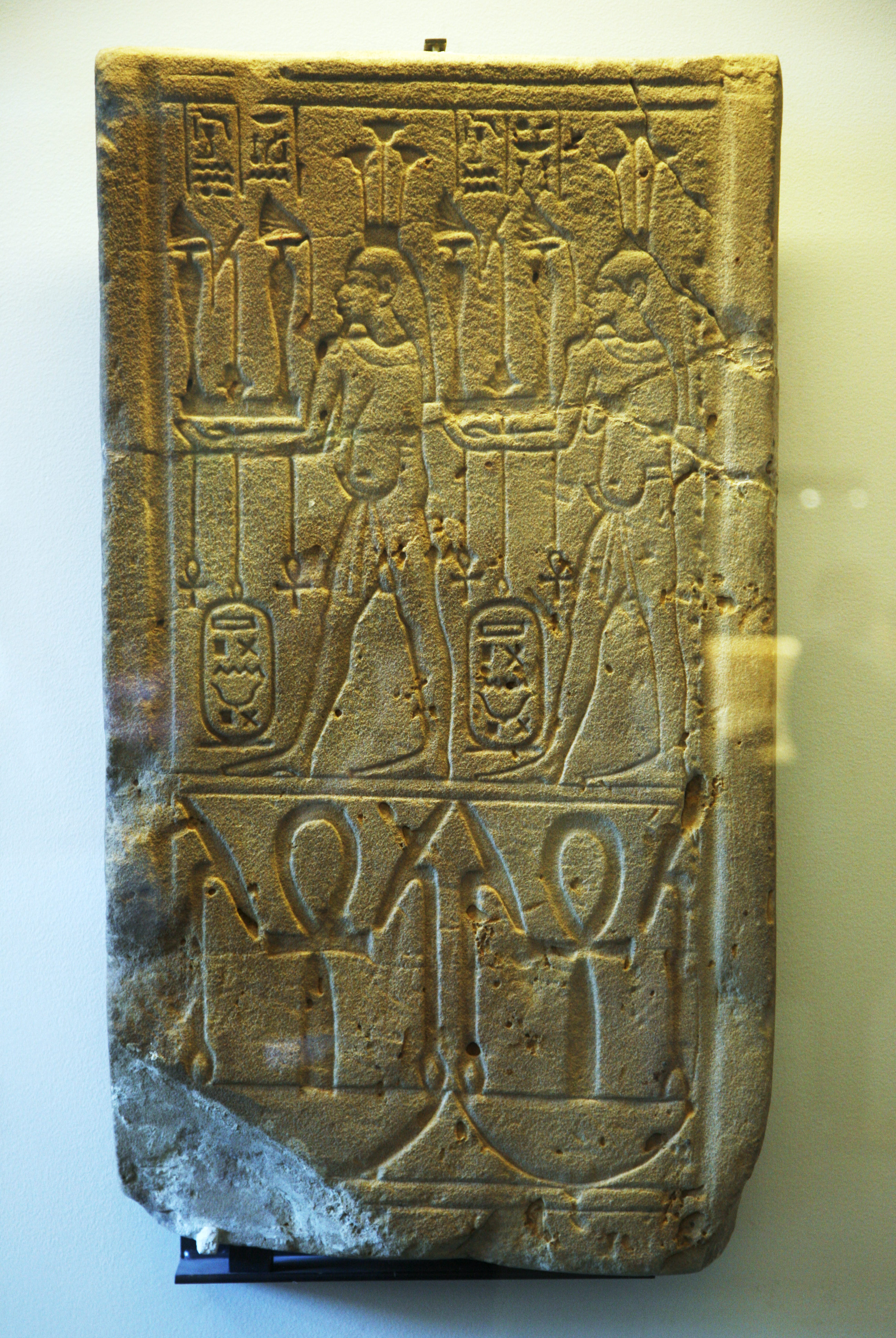
Shepenupet's cartouche

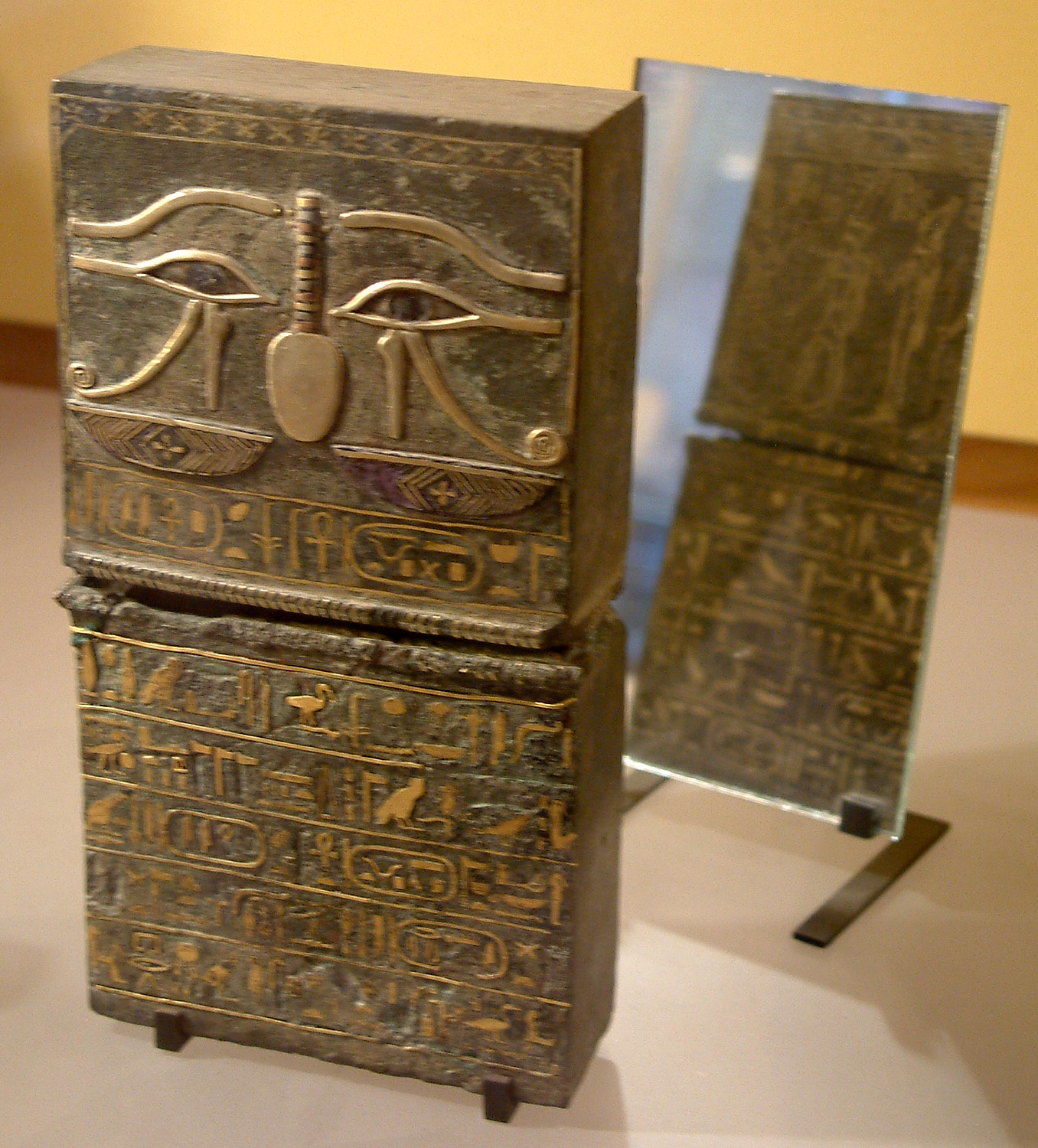
Box with name of Shepenupet

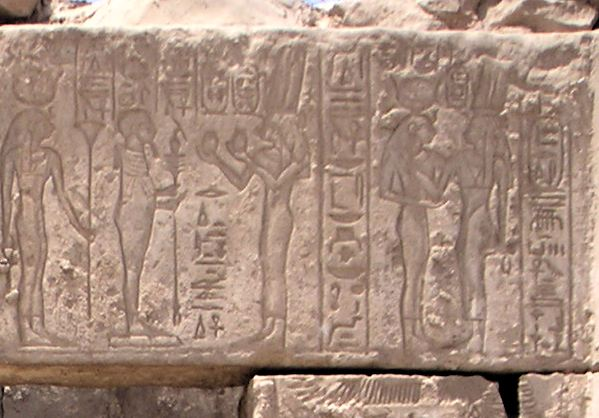
Shepenupet and Amenirdis II

Preceded by Amenirdis I	Divine Adoratrice of Amun around 700–650 BCE	Succeeded by Amenirdis II
Preceded by Amenirdis I	God's Wife of Amun	Succeeded by Nitocris I
