= Amenirdis II =

- Divine Adoratrice of Amun
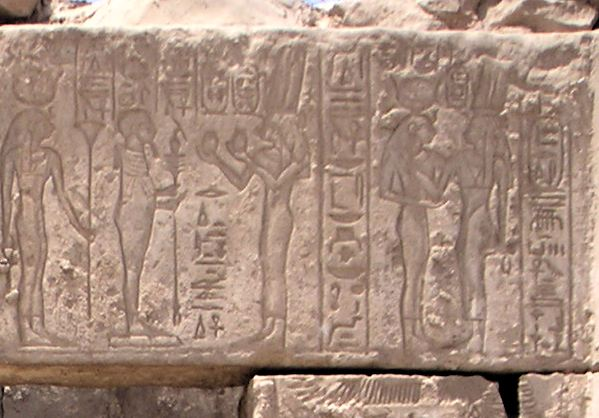
- Amenirdis II (far right) at Karnak
Egyptian name
< i mn n D4 D37 O34 >
Amenirdis
Jmn-'ir-dj-sj
- Tenure: 650–640 BC
- Predecessor: Shepenupet II
- Successor: Nitocris I
- Dynasty: 25th–26th Dynasty
- Spouse: uncertain, possibly Atlanersa
- Father: Taharqa

The ancient Nubian princess Amenirdis II, daughter of the Kushite pharaoh Taharqa of the 25th Dynasty, was adopted by Shepenupet II, daughter of Piye, to become Divine Adoratrice of Amun from around 650 BC to 640 BC during the 26th Dynasty. Amenirdis adopted Nitocris, daughter of Psamtik I, to become her successor. She may have been married to one of Taharqa's sons, king Atlanersa.

Preceded by Shepenupet II	Divine Adoratrice of Amun; 650–640 BCE	Succeeded by Nitocris I
