= Psamtik I =

Egyptian Pharaoh of the 26th Dynasty, r. 664–610 BCE

- Psammetichus
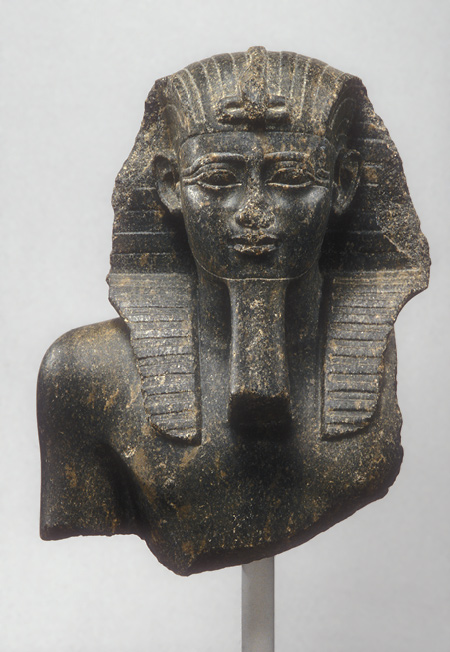
- Bust of Psamtik I, Metropolitan Museum of Art

Pharaoh
- Reign: 664–610 BCE
- Predecessor: Necho I
- Successor: Necho II
Royal titulary
Horus name
Aaib
"The strong-minded one"
| G5 | aA ib Z1 |
Nebty name
Neba
"Possessor of a (strong) arm"
| G16 | V30 D36 |
Golden Horus
Qenu
"The brave one"
| G8 | N29 N35 D40 |
Prenomen
Wahibre
"Constant [is the] Heart [of] Ra"

| M23 X1 L2 X1 | ra wAH ib |
Nomen
Psamtik
"The mixed-wine seller"

| G39 N5 | p s m T k |
- Consort: Mehytenweskhet
- Children: Necho II; Nitocris I
- Father: Necho I
- Mother: Queen Istemabet
- Died: 610 BCE
- Dynasty: 26th Dynasty

Wahibre Psamtik I (Ancient Egyptian: Wꜣḥ-jb-Rꜥ Psmṯk) was the first pharaoh of the Twenty-sixth Dynasty of Egypt, the Saite period, ruling from the city of Sais in the Nile delta between 664 and 610 BCE. He was installed by Ashurbanipal of the Neo-Assyrian Empire, against the Kushite rulers of the Twenty-fifth Dynasty, and later gained more autonomy as the Assyrian Empire declined.

== Name ==
The Egyptian name psmṯk, pronounced as Psamāṯək, was a short form of pꜣ-sꜣ-n-mṯk, meaning "the man of Meṯek", with Meṯek presumably a deity.

His name was rendered by the Assyrians as Pishamilki (Neo-Assyrian Akkadian: 𒁹𒉿𒃻𒈨𒅋𒆠, romanized: Pišamilki), by the Ancient Greeks as Psammētikhos (Ψαμμήτιχος), and by the Romans as Psammētichus.

Psamtik was also called Nabu-shezibanni (Neo-Assyrian Akkadian: 𒁹𒀭𒀝𒊺𒍦𒀀𒉌 and 𒁹𒀭𒉺𒊺𒍦𒀭𒉌 Nabu-šezibanni), meaning "O Nabu, save me!" by the Assyrians.

== Background ==
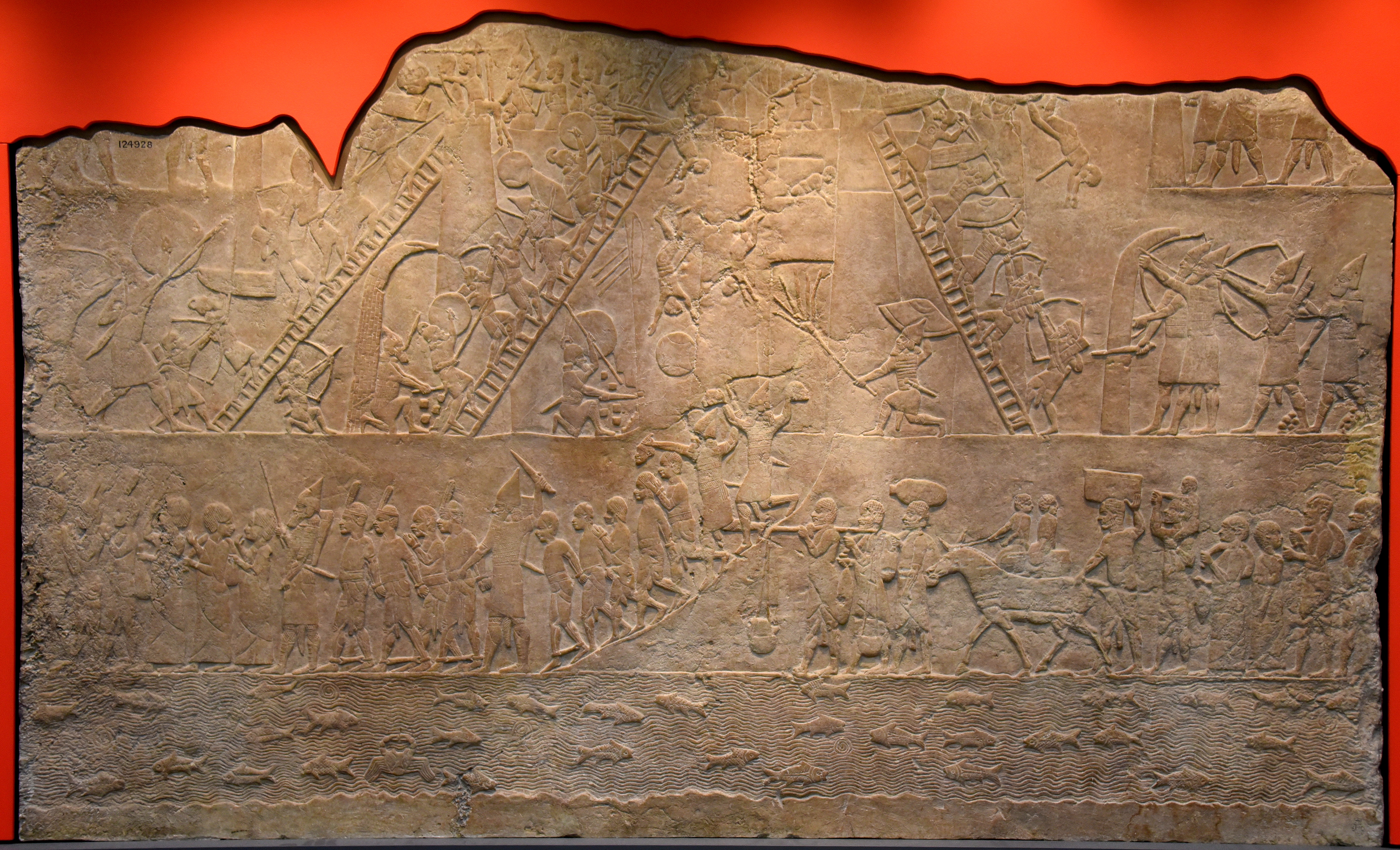
Assyrian capture of an Egyptian city from the Kushite Pharaoh Taharqa or Tantamani, possibly Memphis in 663 BCE. British Museum.

In 671 BCE, the Assyrian king Esarhaddon invaded Egypt. This invasion was directed against the Kushite rulers of the Twenty-fifth Dynasty of Egypt, who had been in control of Upper Egypt, rather than against the native Egyptian rulers. The Assyrians created an administration relying on local Egyptian rulers, and put in place the twelve kinglets who formed a Dodecarchy ruling over the Nile Delta. They also formed alliances with the ruler of the city of Sais, Necho I, who was the most powerful of the Delta kinglets, as well as with Pakruru, the ruler of the important nome of Per-Sopdu.

In 665 BCE, the Kushite king Tantamani invaded Lower Egypt again, and Necho I and Pakruru resisted the Kushite attack. Necho I died in battle and his son Psamtik I fled to Syria, while Pakruru became the spokesperson of the Delta kinglets during the peace negotiations with Tantamani at Memphis.

The next year, in 664 BCE, the Assyrians under Esarhaddon's son Ashurbanipal invaded Egypt again, and the Assyrian army retook Memphis, proceeded with the Sack of Thebes, and expelled Tantamani from Egypt. Necho I's son Psamtik I returned to Egypt with this invading force, was installed by the Assyrians as the ruler of Sais and Memphis, and concluded with the Assyrians an adû agreement, some type of superior-inferior relation, but none of the Assyrian sources details the arrangements.

== Reign ==
For the first two years of his reign, Psamtik I ruled in conformity with the arrangement implemented by the Assyrians in Egypt as one of many vassal kinglets of the Egyptian Dodecarchy. According to Herodotus, during this period, Psamtik unwittingly fulfilled a prophecy by an oracle which promised the kingship of all Egypt to whoever poured a libation from a bronze vessel, after which the other kinglets of the Dodecarchy chased him from Memphis, of which he lost the rule, and he had to flee into the swamps of the Nile Delta.

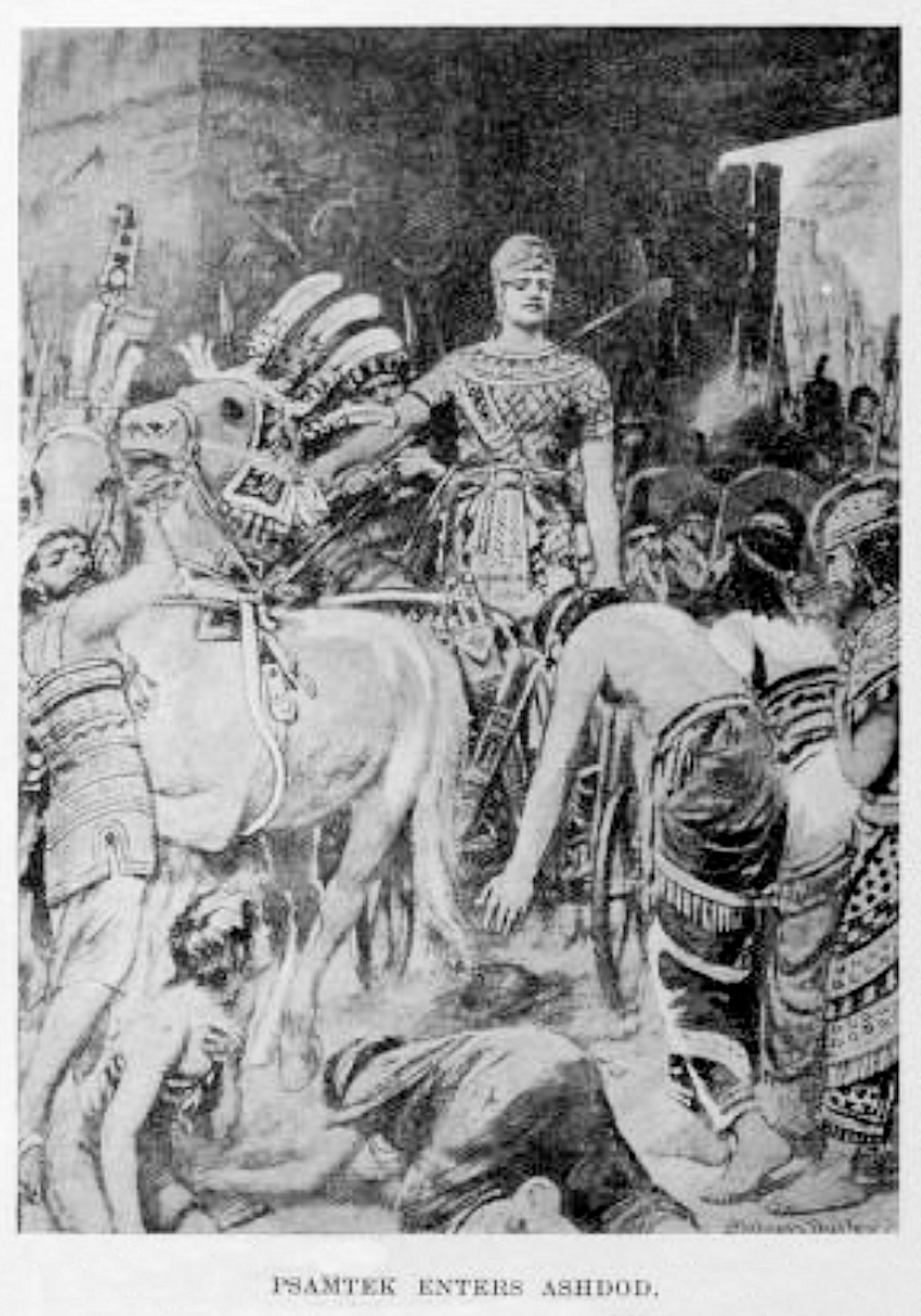
Egyptian ruler Psamtik I during the fall of Ashdod in 635 BCE, illustration by Patrick Gray, 1900.

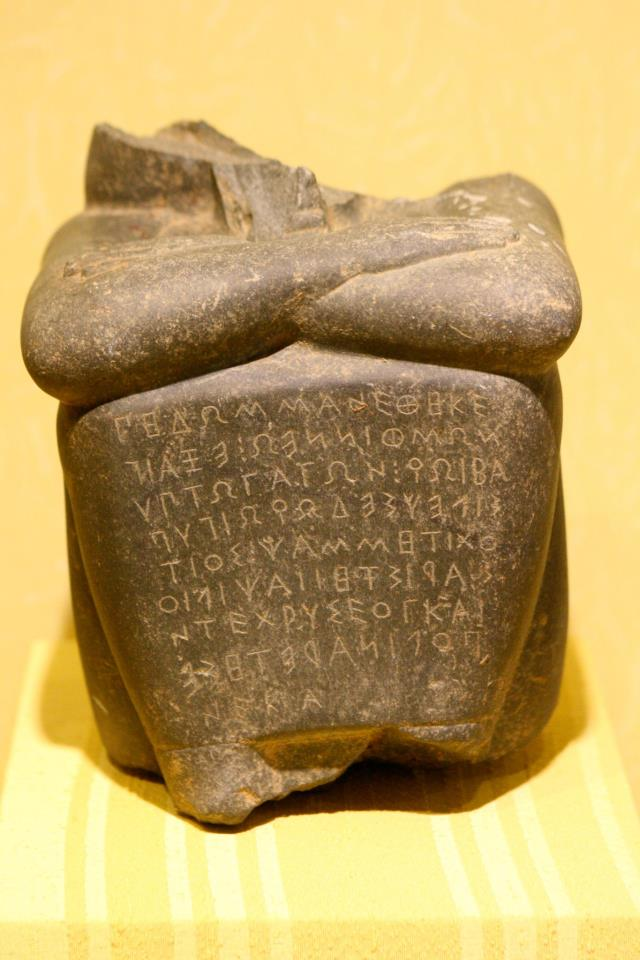
7th century statue found in Kale mentioning Psamtik I. The Ionian Greek inscription reads, "Amphimeos' son Pedon brought me from Egypt and gave as a votive; Psammetichos, the king of Egypt gave him a city for his virtue and a golden diadem for his virtue."

After being chased from Memphis, Psamtik I received another similar prophecy from the goddess Wadjet of Buto, who promised him the rule over all Egypt should he employ bronze men from the sea. Beginning in 662 BCE, Psamtik I formed contacts with Gyges, the king of the Anatolian kingdom of Lydia, who sent to Egypt the Ionian Greek and Carian mercenaries that Psamtik I used to reconquer Memphis and defeat the other kinglets of the Dodecarchy, some of whom fled to Libya. Psamtik I might have been also aided in these military campaigns by Arabs from the Sinai Peninsula.

After having eliminated all his rivals, Psamtik I reorganized these mercenaries and placed them in key garrisons at Daphnae in the East and Elephantine in the South to prevent a possible Kushite attack and to control trade. This military aid from Lydia lasted until 658 BCE, at which point Gyges faced an impending Cimmerian invasion. By Psamtik I's 4th regnal year, he completed the forging of an alliance with the powerful family of the Masters of Shipping from Heracleopolis, and by his 8th regnal year in 657 BCE, he was in full control of the Delta.

Interpretations of Psamtik I's wars as an alliance between Sais and Lydia against Assyria appear to be inaccurate, despite negative attitudes of the Assyrians towards Gyges's and Psamtik's actions. The Assyrians had risen Sais into preeminence in Egypt after expelling the Saites' Kushite enemies from the country, but Psamtik I and Ashurbanipal had signed a treaty with each other, and no hostilities between them is recorded. Thus Psamtik I and Ashurbanipal had remained allies ever since the former had been put in power with Assyrian military support. The participation of the Arab tribes of the Sinai, who were Assyrian vassals, further attest to the lack of enmity between Sais and Assyria at this period, and the silence of Assyrian sources concerning Psamtik I's expansion imply there was no hostility, whether overt or covert, between Assyria and Sais during Psamtik I's unification of Egypt under his rule.

Likewise, Gyges's military support of Psamtik I was not directed against Assyria and is not mentioned as hostile to Assyria or allied with other countries against Assyria in Assyrian records; the Assyrian disapproval of Gyges's support for Psamtik I was primarily motivated by Gyges's refusal to form an alliance with Assyria and his undertaking of these actions independently of Assyria, which the Assyrians interpreted as an act of arrogance, rather than by the support itself. Psamtik I's campaigns were not directed against Assyrian power and appear to have been conducted only against the rival kinglets of the Delta, and Ashurbanipal's disapproval of his actions were motivated not by his claim of kingship over Egypt, but by his revocation of the adû agreement between the two kings, as well as by Psamtik I's elimination of the other kinglets allied to Assyria, especially Pakruru of Per-Sopdu and Šarru-lū-dāri, since Ashurbanipal was aware that he had to rely on those kinglets to maintain Assyrian power in Egypt.

In Psamtik I's 9th regnal year, in 656 BCE, he sent an expedition to the city of Thebes which compelled the existing God's Wife of Amun, Shepenupet II, daughter of the former Kushite Pharaoh Piye, to adopt his daughter Nitocris I as her heiress in the so-called Adoption Stela. This was concluded with the approval of the Theban aristocracy and the tacit support of Mentuemhat, who was the Fourth Priest of Amun and the Mayor of Thebes. Psamtik I had unified all of Egypt under his rule.

In 655 and 654 BCE, that is his 10th and 11th regnal years, Psamtik I carried out a war with Libyan tribes who had seized control of the area from the Oxyrhynchite nome around the Bahr Yussef till the Mediterranean Sea, and who had been joined by Psamtik I's previously defeated enemies from his wars in the Delta. Following the successful conclusion of this war, Psamtik I placed an Egyptian garrison at Marea to prevent incursions by Libyans from the desert. Thus, by the end of his first decade of rule in 654 BCE, Psamtik I was firmly in control of all Egypt.

According to Herodotus, Psamtik carried out a twenty-nine year siege of Ashdod. The exact dating of this siege is uncertain.

In the later part of Psamtik I's reign, the Neo-Assyrian Empire started unravelling following the death of Ashurbanipal in 627 BCE, leaving a power vacuum in the Levant which allowed the Assyrians' former Scythian vassals to overrun the area. Some time between 623 and 616 BCE, the Scythians reached as far south as Judah and Edom until Psamtik I met them and convinced them to turn back by offering them gifts.

Following the encounter with the Scythians, Psamtik expanded his military operations through the Via Maris into the Levant to support the collapsing Assyrian Empire against the Medes, Babylonians, Scythians and Chaldeans who had revolted against it. Psamtik I's intervention implied that an alliance had already been concluded between him and the Neo-Assyrian Empire, although it is unknown whether it was a new alliance between him and the new Assyrian king Sin-shar-ishkun or a renewal of the old alliance signed when Psamtik I had been enthroned by the Assyrian army as king of Sais in 664 BCE.

Stela dated to Year 51 of Psammetikhos I, dedicated by Paderpsu. Berlin 8348 (lost).

Psamtik died in 610 BCE and was succeeded by his son, Necho II.

== Investigation into the origin of language ==
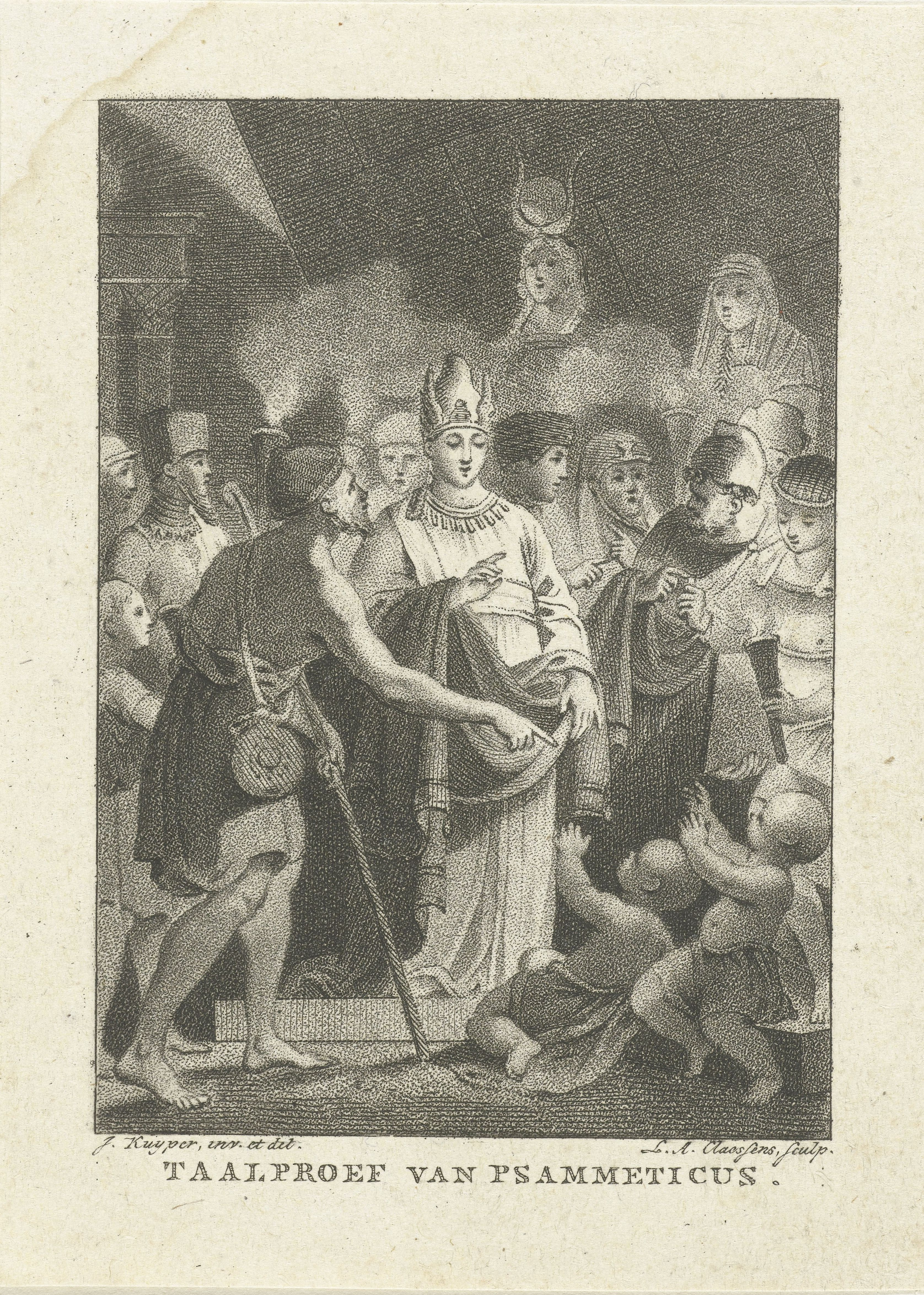
Legend of the linguistic experiment by Psamtik I

The Greek historian Herodotus conveyed an anecdote about Psamtik in the second book of his Histories (2.2). During his visit to Egypt, Herodotus heard that Psammetichus ("Psamṯik") sought to discover the origin of language by conducting an experiment with two children. Allegedly he gave two newborn babies to a shepherd, with the instructions that no one should speak to them, but that the shepherd should feed and care for them while listening to determine their first words. The hypothesis was that the first word would be uttered in the root language of all people. When one of the children cried "βεκός" (bekós) with outstretched arms, the shepherd reported this to Psammetichus, who concluded that the word was Phrygian because that was the sound of the Phrygian word for "bread". Thus, they concluded that the Phrygians were an older people than the Egyptians, and that Phrygian was the original language of men. There are no other extant sources to verify this story.

== Wives ==
Psamtik's chief wife was Mehytenweskhet, the daughter of Harsiese, the vizier of the North and High Priest of Re at Heliopolis. Psamtik and Mehytenweskhet were the parents of Necho II, Merneith, and the Divine Adoratrice Nitocris I.

Psamtik's father-in-law—the aforementioned Harsiese—was married twice: to Sheta, with whom he had a daughter named Naneferheres, and to an unknown woman, by whom he had both Djedkare, who succeeded him as vizier of the North, and Mehytenweskhet.

== Discovery of a colossal statue ==
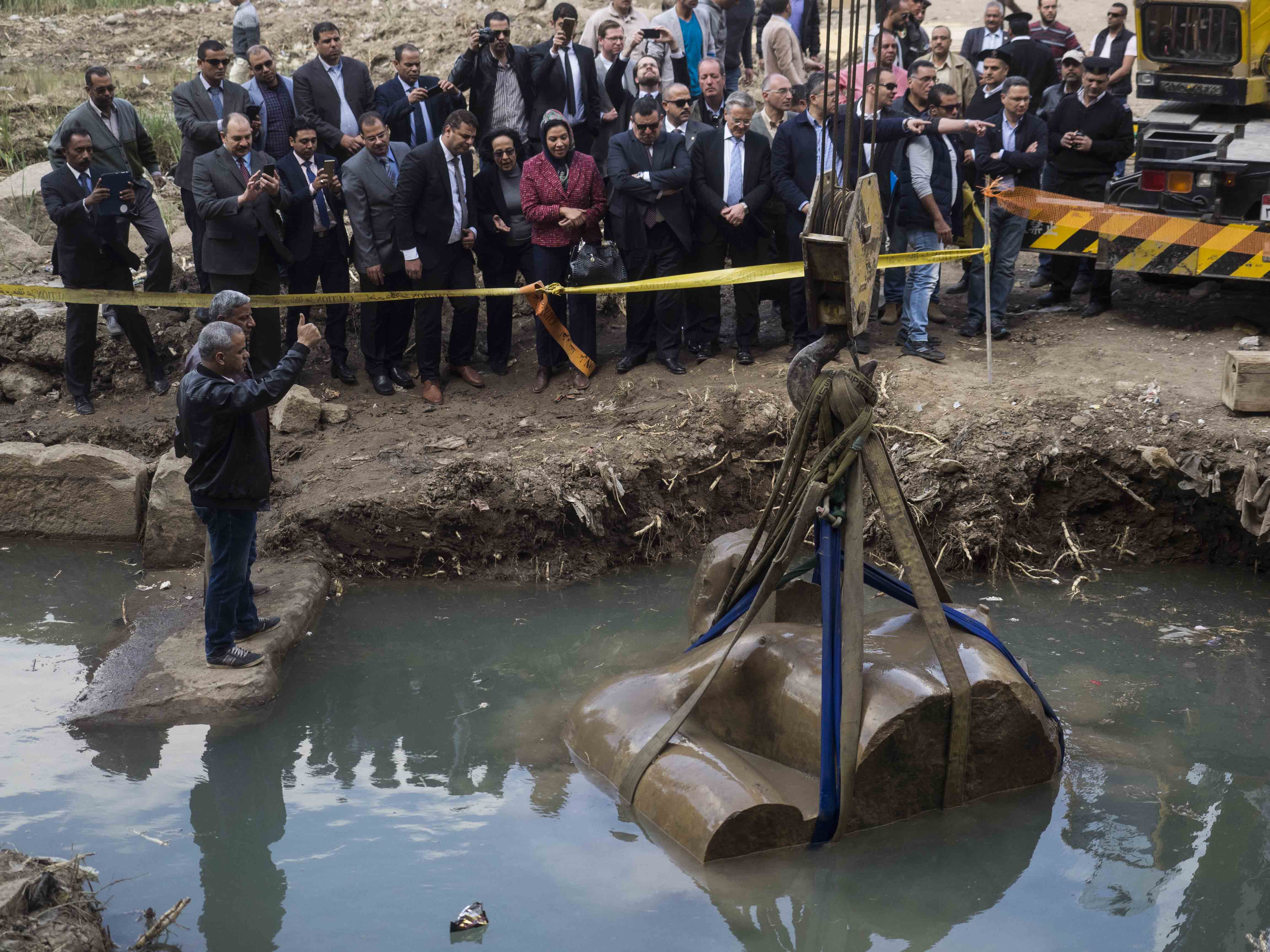
The statue being recovered from groundwater

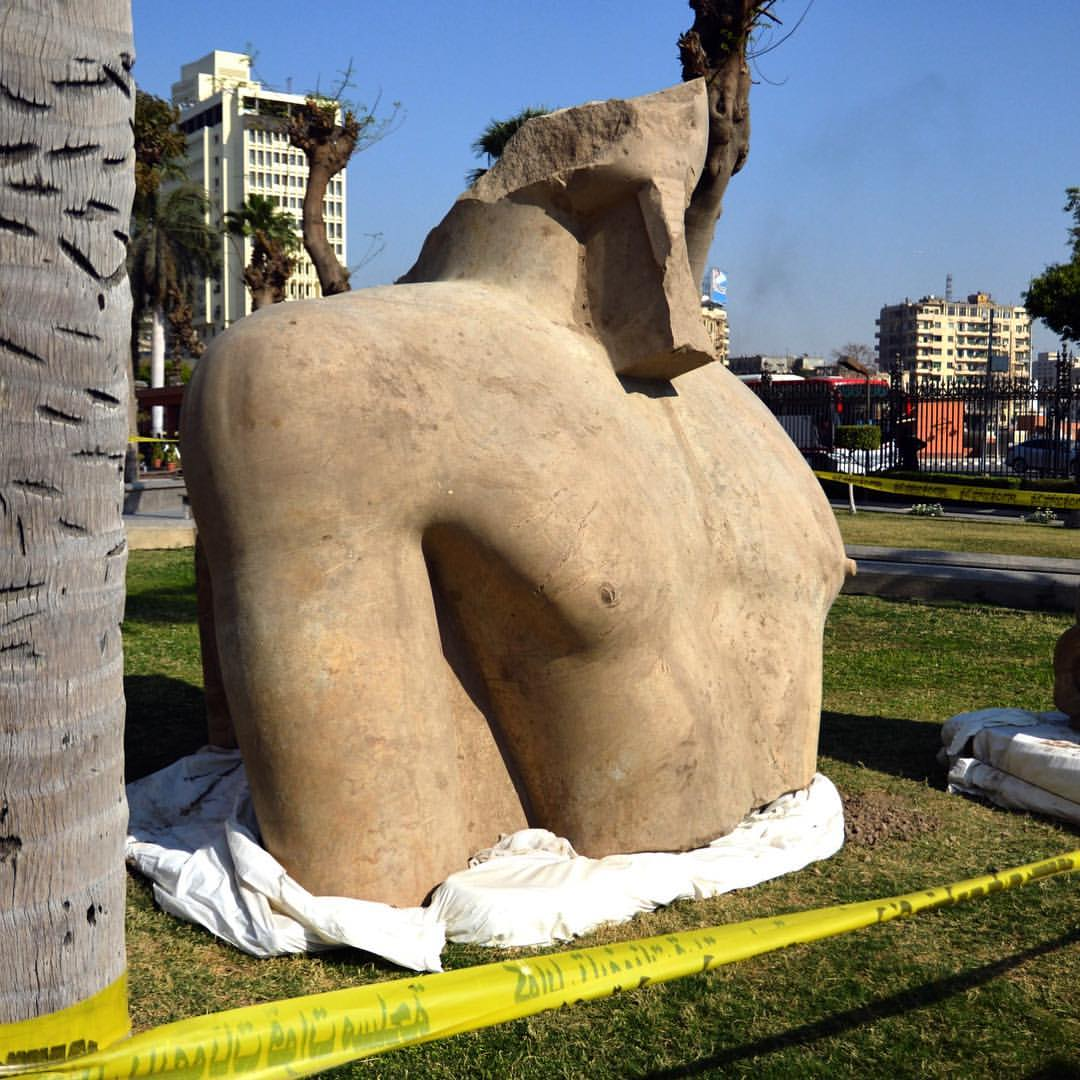
Torso of the statue in the museum garden, 2017

Reconstruction, with indication of size

On 9 March 2017, Egyptian and German archaeologists discovered a colossal statue about 7.9 metres (26 ft) in height at the Heliopolis site in Cairo. Made of quartzite, the statue was found in a fragmentary state, with the bust, the lower part of the head and the crown submerged in groundwater.

While the statue was initially speculated to be of Ramesses II, it was later been confirmed to be of Psamtik I due to engravings found that mentioned one of Psamtik's names on the base of the statue. A spokesperson at the time commented that "If it does belong to this king, then it is the largest statue of the Late Period that was ever discovered in Egypt." The head and torso are expected to be moved to the Grand Egyptian Museum.

The statue was sculpted in the ancient classical style of 2000 BCE, establishing a resurgence to the greatness and prosperity of the classical period, and reconstructions bear a strong similarity with a statue of a striding Senusret I (1971–1926 BCE), now in the Cairo Museum. However, from the many fragments of quartzite collected (now 6,400 of them), it has been established that the colossus was at some time deliberately destroyed. Certain discolored and cracked rock fragments show evidence of having been heated to high temperatures then shattered (with cold water), a typical way of destroying ancient colossi.

== Gallery ==
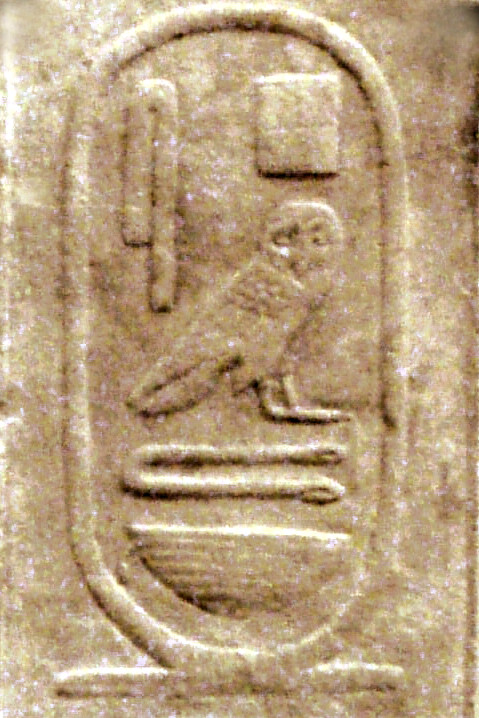
Cartouche of Psamtik

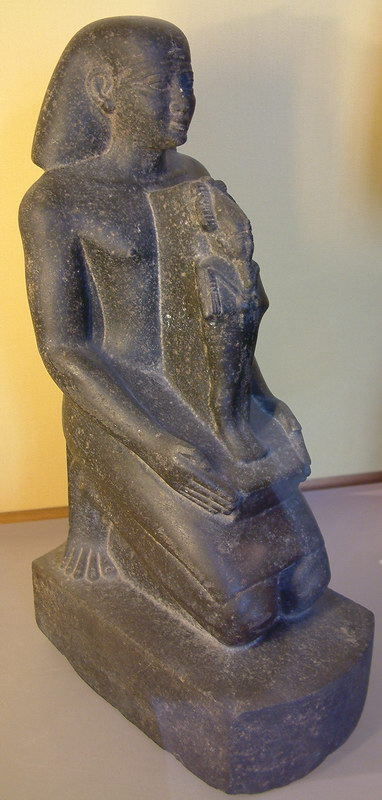
Psamtik I kneeling, Louvre Museum

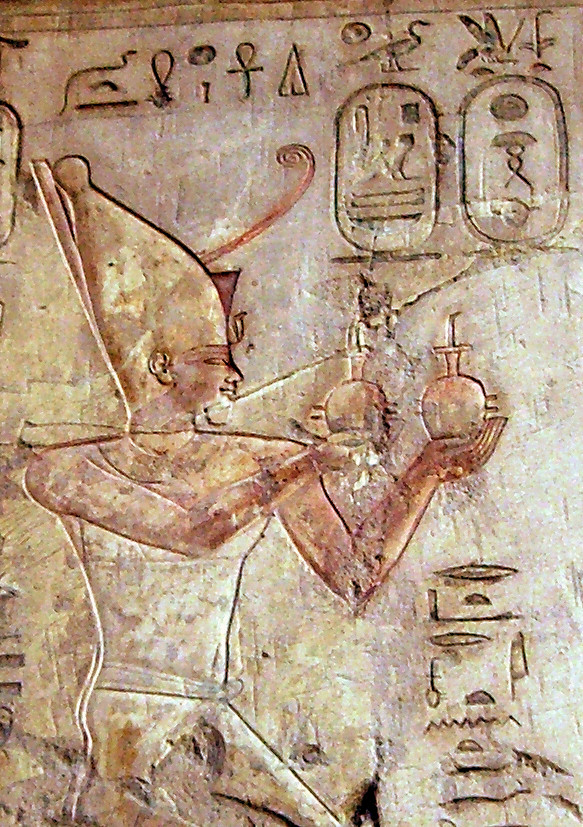
Relief of Psamtik I making an offering to Ra-Horakhty (Tomb of Pabasa)

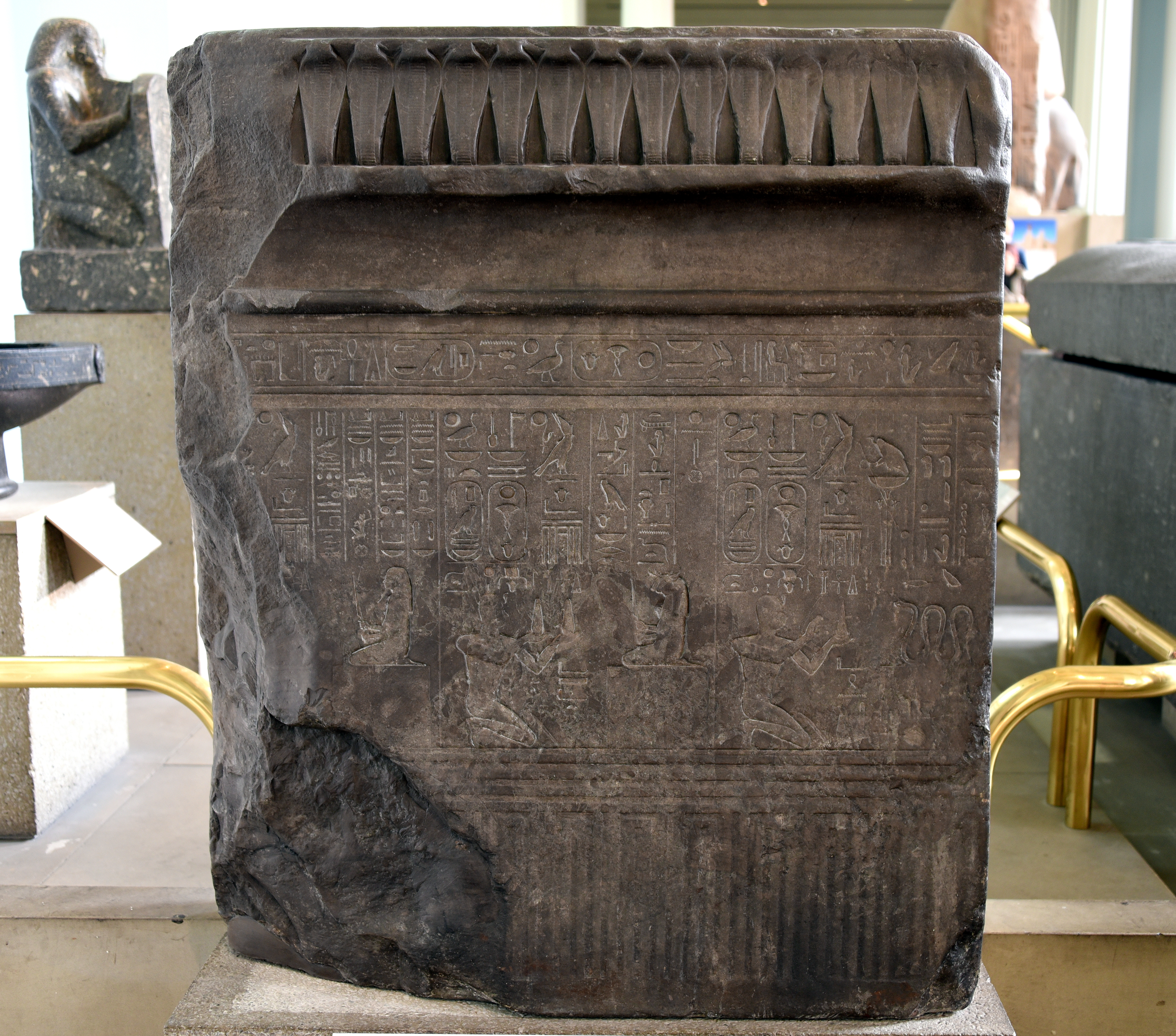
Slab of Psamtik I. The king kneels and makes offerings to fearsome-looking deities, including a double-headed bull god and a snake. From Alexandria; originally from the temple of Atum at Heliopolis, Egypt. British Museum
