= Pabasa =

Ancient Egyptian noble

- Chief Steward of the God's Wife of Amun
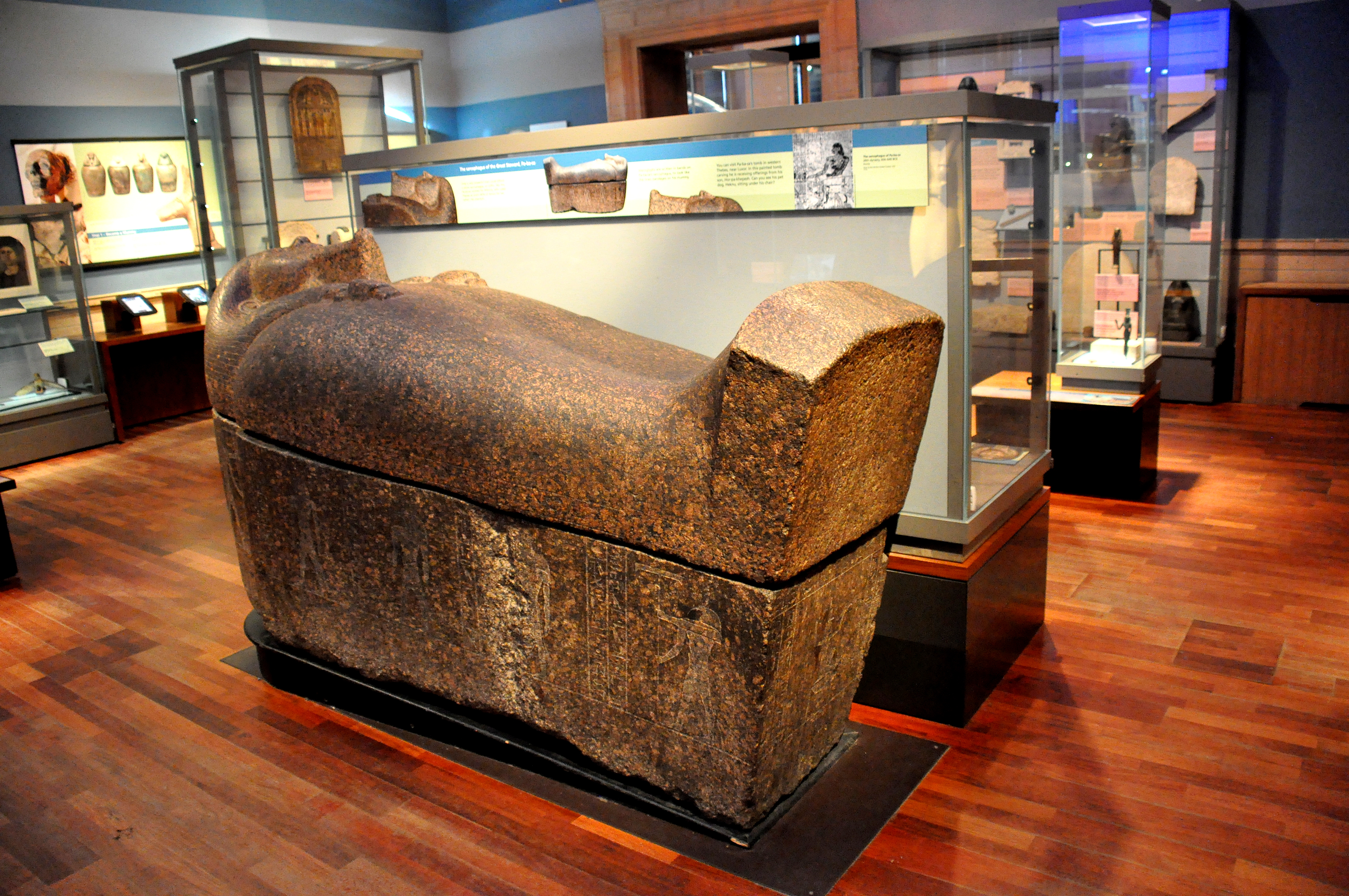
- Sarcophagus of Pabasa at the Kelvingrove Art Gallery and Museum, Glasgow.
- Dynasty: 26th of Egypt
- Pharaoh: Psamtik I
- Burial: TT279

The ancient Egyptian noble Pabasa was chief steward of the God's Wife of Amun Nitocris I during the Saite Period. He is buried in tomb TT279, which is located in the El-Assasif, part of the Theban Necropolis, near Thebes.

His sarcophagus was acquired in Paris in 1836 by Alexander Douglas-Hamilton, 10th Duke of Hamilton and was kept at Hamilton Palace until it was given to the Kelvingrove Art Gallery and Museum in Glasgow by the Hamilton Estate Trustees in 1922.

== Pabasa’s Family ==
The names of Pabasa's parents are known from several funerary cone inscriptions. His father was a "father and beloved of God" named Pa-di-Bastet, and his mother, who always bore the simple title "Lady of the House," was called Ta-senet-net-Hor. The name of Pabasa's eldest son, Tjai-Hor-pa-khepesh, has also been known for some time and appears repeatedly in his tomb at el-Assasif. We owe the name of Pabasa's wife, Tjas-Aset-peret, to the careful examination of tomb TT279 by Günter Vittmann in 1975. He was able to identify the previously overlooked mention of Tjai-Hor-pa-khepesh's mother on both sides of the passage on the north side of the atrium. She is thus one of the few wives of a chief estate manager known by name. Vittmann was able to indirectly identify another son of Pabasa and Tjas-Aset-peret. Given that Tjai-Hor-pa-khepesh is consistently referred to as Pabasa's "eldest son" in the tomb, it can be assumed that there was at least one other male descendant. In an unfinished chamber in the southwest corner of tomb TT279, Vittmann finally found the remains of two painted hieroglyphic inscriptions containing the name of another Pabasa. Since the titles mentioned there are strikingly different from those of the tomb owner, but astonishingly similar to those of the older brother, it can be assumed that this refers to another Pabasa, Pabasa the Younger. Finally, if one identifies the owner of the tomb TT279 with Pabasa, named in a demotic papyrus, as the “chief of the employees of the worshiper of God”, according to Vittmann, then we obtain another member of the family, the daughter Hes-hen-Imen-mehit-em-wesechet

One of Pabasa's grandsons was Pedubast, the chief steward and overseer of Upper Egypt, whose burial was discovered in 2015, located within the tomb TT391 at El-Assasif.

== Timeline ==
The cartouches on the architraves of the atrium of TT279 already allow us to establish a rough date for Pabasa's timeline: they mention Psamtik I (664–610 BC), the first king of the 26th Dynasty, and the god-wife of Amun, Nitocris, Psamtik I's daughter. Since these names appear repeatedly at various points in the tomb (especially in connection with Pabasa's title) and were never supplemented or replaced by cartouches of equal rank, Pabasa's reign can be dated with absolute certainty to the joint reign of the two named individuals, i.e., approximately 656–610 BC. Considering the terms of office of Pabasa's colleagues, a relatively clear definition of his reign within this long period emerges. The successor of the great nomarch Montuemhat, Nesiptah II, who was tolerated and elevated to office by Psamtik I, most likely died between the 17th and 25th years of this king's reign, i.e., between 647 and 640 BC. Since Ibi, another colleague of Pabasa, was appointed chief administrator of the Nitocris's assets in the 26th year of his reign (i.e., 639), the latter date is even closer. Therefore, classifying Pabasa as Ibi's successor is more than likely and, taking into account his predecessor's term in office, leads to Pabasa's term in office from approximately 625 to 610 BC.

While there has been debate as to whether Pabasa should be classified as the first of the Saite chief administrators, the decoration of tomb TT279 alone, in which Shepenupet II, then the god's wife, is referred to exclusively as Maa-kheru, meaning deceased, speaks against this dating. Lichtheim further argues that Shepenupet II must have died around the time of Ibi's accession to office and convincingly demonstrates that this god's wife's name is only cited in genealogical contexts. Kees has provided evidence for Shepenupet's burial during his term of office in a title of Ibi: ma seschta Djeret-netjer Shepenupet em Wabet. Pabasa could only be the first of all chief administrators of the wealth if Shepenupet II had already died several years before 639, thus requiring the assumption of another official between Ibi and his grandson Padihorresnet. However, this reconstruction is more than unlikely – simply because of the lack of evidence of names. The dating of Pabasa to the period 625–610 BC is also supported by the fact that Padihorresnet inherited titles from both his great-grandfather Ibi and his (in this case postulated) predecessor Pabasa, which would hardly have been useful as additional legitimation in the case of a direct succession of his relative.

== Literature ==
- Ludwig Borchardt: Statuen und Statuetten von Königen und Privatleuten III, Catalogue Général des Antiquités Égyptiennes du Musée du Caire, Nos 654–950. Berlin 1930, S. 155–156 [922].
- Colin Campbell: The Sarcophagus of Pabasa in Hamilton Palace, Scotland. Edinburgh 1910.
- Christophe: Karnak-Nord III (1945-49). In: Fouilles de l’Institut français d’archéologie orientale du Caire. (FIFAO) Band 23, Kairo 1951, S. 40–41, 131–132.
- Georges Daressy: Recueil de cônes funéraires (= Mémoires de la Mission archéologique française. Band VIII). Paris 1894, S. 191.
- Erhart Graefe: Untersuchungen zur Verwaltung und Geschichte der Institution der Gottesgemahlin des Amun vom Beginn des Neuen Reiches bis zur Spätzeit. Band I In: Ägyptologische Abhandlungen. (ÄA) Band 37, Harrassowitz, Wiesbaden 1981, ISBN 3-447-02174-8, S. 64.
- Nancy Katherine Thomas: A Typological Study of Saite Tombs at Thebes. Dissertation, University of California, Los Angeles / Ann Arbor 1983.
- Miroslav Verner: Statue of Tweret (Cairo Museum no. 39145) Dedicated by Pabesi and Several Remarks on the Role of the Hippopotamus Goddess. In: Zeitschrift für Ägyptische Sprache und Altertumskunde. Band 96, 1970, S. 52–63.
- Günther Vittmann: Neues zu Pabasa, Obermajordomus der Nitokris. In: Studien zur Altägyptischen Kultur. Band 5, 1977, S. 245–264.
