= Nespaqashuty =

F20 p A28 S9
Nespaqashuty
in hieroglyphs
Era: 3rd Intermediate Period
(1069–664 BC)

Nespaqashuty, Nespakashuty, Nespekashuty, Nesipakashuti, Nespaqashuti, Nespakheshuty, or Nespekishuti is the name of several persons from Ancient Egypt, some of them viziers:

- Nespaqashuty i, chief inspector and general, son of Paisen ii
- Nespaqashuty ii, chief inspector and general, Third Prophet of Khons-in-Thebes Neferhotep, grandson of Nespaqashuty i
- Nespaqashuty iii or Nespaqashuty A, vizier, great-grandson of Nespaqashuty ii, son of DjedThutefankh i
- Nespaqashuty iv, father of Pashedmut
- Nespaqashuty v, son of DjedThutefankh iv, great-grandson of Nespaqashuty iii
- Nespaqashuty B, father of the vizier Pamiu
- Nespaqashuty C, Vizier of the South during the early 25th Dynasty, grandfather of Nespaqashuty D
- Nespaqashuty D, vizier of Psamtik I, son of Nespamedu, grandson of Nespaqashuty C
