= Pedubast (high steward) =

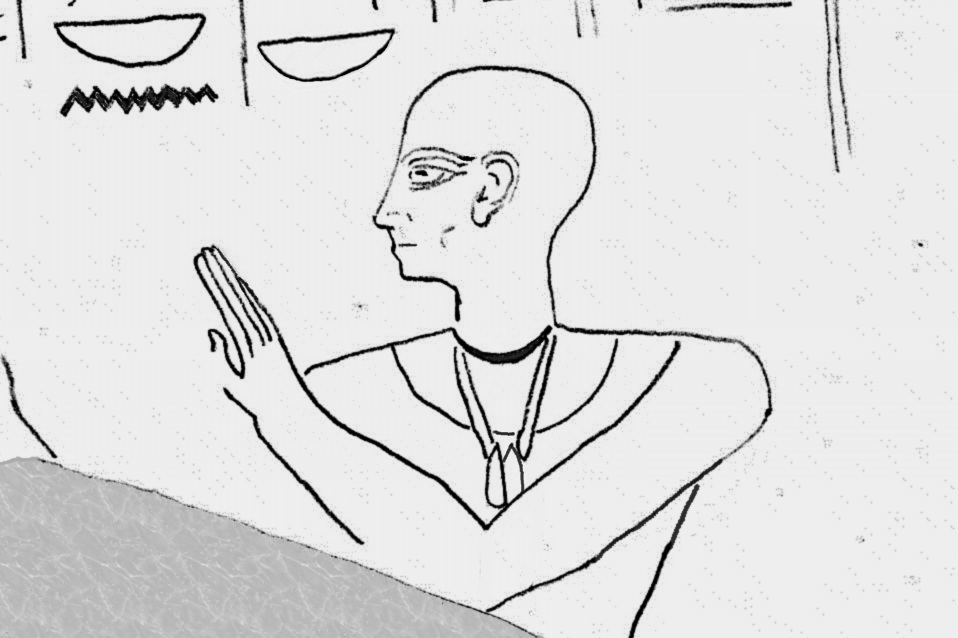
Sketch of a relief depicting Pedubast, from TT391

Pedubast (also Padibast, or Padibastet) was an ancient Egyptian official during the 26th Dynasty. He is so far only known from his burial, found within the larger and earlier (25th Dynasty) tomb complex of the mayor of Thebes Karabasken (TT391), located at South El-Assasif within the Theban Necropolis, in Upper Egypt.
Pedubast's burial was found in 2015 and announced shortly after. He was most likely the grandson of the well known chief steward of the God's Wife Pabasa who was buried in another large funerary complex at Thebes (TT279). Pedubast was overseer of Upper Egypt and chief steward of the God's Wife; in the latter position he managed the estates of the God's Wife of Amun, the leading religious figure in southern Egypt at the time. Pedubast only reinscribed some parts of the burial chapel of Karabasken. It seems that he was only for a short time in office having not enough time to build an own monumental tomb. The newly decorated parts include a door frame and a sun hymn. Fragments of his coffin were found too.
