= TT390 =

Theban tomb

Theban tomb TT390
- Burial site of Irterau
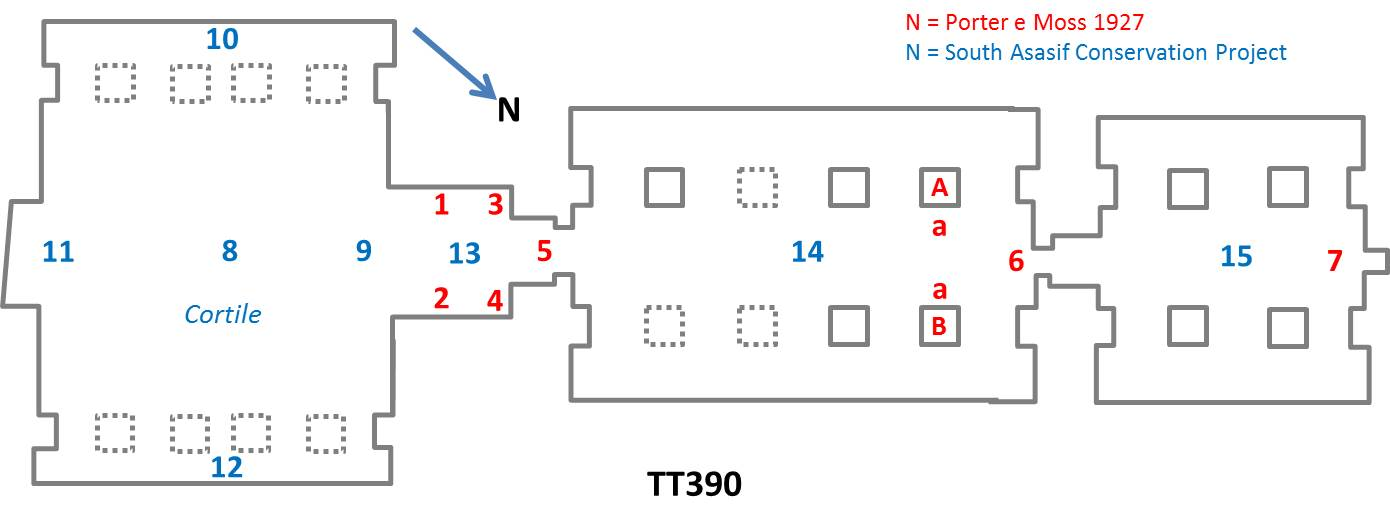

- Location within Egypt
- Location: South El-Assasif, Theban Necropolis
- Discovered: 1820
- ← Previous; TT389 Next → TT391

ir ir Z2 w r w Z1 B1
Irterau
in hieroglyphs
Era: New Kingdom
(1550–1069 BC)

The Theban Tomb TT390 is located in South El-Assasif, part of the Theban Necropolis, on the west bank of the Nile, opposite to Luxor. It is the burial place of the ancient Egyptian female scribe and Chief attendant of the Divine Adoratrice of Amun, Nitocris I, Irterau. Irterau lived during the reign of Psamtik I She was the daughter of the Divine Father of Amun Ipwer and his wife Tashaiu. In the court of the tomb her grandfather Zeho is also mentioned. Zeho was also a Divine Father of Amun.

Irterau was the wife of Vizier Nespamedu who was buried in Abydos and the mother of the Vizier Nespakashuty D who was buried in TT312.

TT390 was first discovered in 1820 by Wilkinson, Hey and Burton, then by Lepsius; it was reopened in 2001.

== See also ==
- List of Theban tombs
