= Nespaqashuty C =

Ancient Egyptian vizier

- Vizier of the South
Egyptian name
F20 p A28 S9
- Dynasty: 25th Dynasty
- Pharaoh: Shebitku
- Burial: Abydos Tomb D13
- Spouse: Takhaenbast
- Children: Nespamedu, Takhaenbast

Nespaqashuty C was an ancient Egyptian Vizier who officiated during the early 25th Dynasty, during the reign of pharaoh Shebitku. Being the "Vizier of the South", he resided and officiated from Thebes, in Upper Egypt.

Nespaqashuty is known from two small magical bricks found in tomb D13 in Abydos. Nespaqashuty C is the father of the Vizier Nespamedu and the grandfather of Vizier Nespaqashuty D. Nespaqashuty was married to the lady Takhaenbast and also had a daughter of that same name.
