= Aten (city) =

Archeological site in Egypt

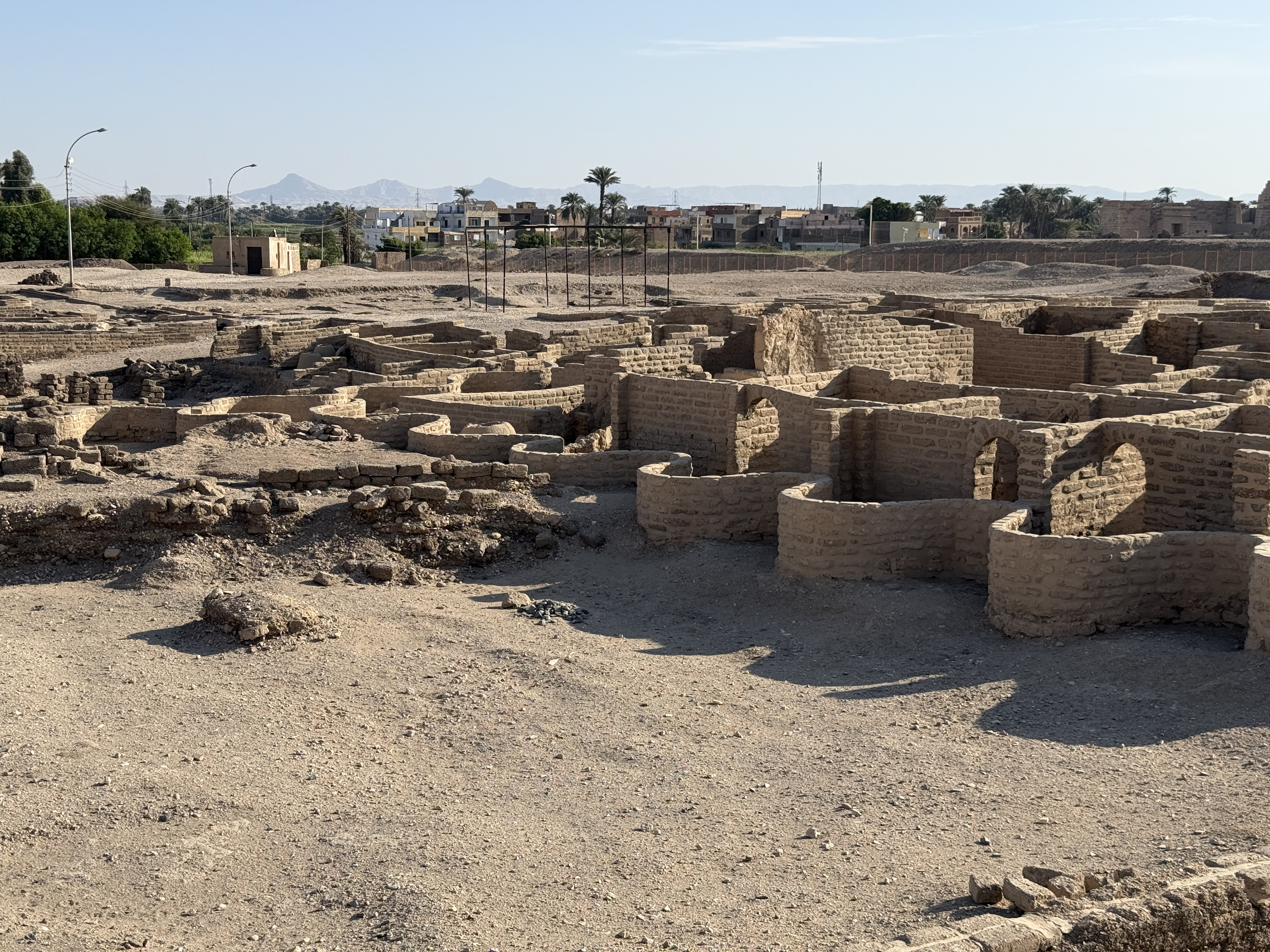

- Location within Egypt
- 25°43′21″N 32°36′06″E
- Type: Settlement
- Periods: New Kingdom of Egypt
- Associated with: Amenhotep IV; Tutankhamun
- Location: Luxor, Luxor Governorate, Egypt
- Region: Upper Egypt
- Part of: Theban Necropolis, Thebes

History
- Built: 1386–1353 BCE

Site notes
- Excavation dates: September 2020 onwards
- Archaeologists: Zahi Hawass
- Discovered: 8 April 2021 (confirmation announced)

UNESCO World Heritage Site
- Official name: Ancient Thebes with its Necropolis
- Type: Cultural
- Criteria: i, iii, vi
- Designated: 1979 (3rd session)
- Reference no.: 87
- Region: Arab States

Aten, properly called The Dazzling Aten (Note: "The inscription that found inside here says that this city was called: 'The dazzling Aten', Hawass told reporters at the site." (Magdy 2021)) though dubbed initially by archaeologists the Rise of Aten, (Note: "The Egyptologists have dubbed the project 'The Rise of Aten,' after a mud seal identifying the city as 'the domain of the dazzling Aten'." (Cascone 2021)) is the remains of an ancient Egyptian city on the west bank of the Nile in the Theban Necropolis near Luxor. Named after Egyptian sun god Aten, the city appears to have remained relatively intact for over three millennia. Since excavation began in late 2020, it is emerging as the largest city of its kind in ancient Egypt, with a remarkable degree of preservation, leading to comparisons with Pompeii.

== History ==
Aten in hieroglyphs
Q3 N35 M17 V13 N35 N5 U33 V28 N35 S15
pn-ṯḥn-jtn (Pen-tjehen Aten)
The Dazzling Aten

The city's foundation is dated to the period of Amenhotep III, some 3,400 years ago (1386–1353 BCE). A number of inscriptions enabled archaeologists to establish precise dates for the city's history. One refers to 1337 BCE, coinciding with the reign of Akhenaten, who is thought to have shifted to his new capital at Akhetaten the following year. Traces uncovered so far suggest that Aten subsequently fell under the rule of Tutankhaten, who changed his name to Tutankhamun after another Egyptian god, and thereafter was used by the penultimate ruler of the Eighteenth Dynasty, Ay. So far four distinct settlement layers attest to renewed habitation as late as the Coptic Byzantine era, from the 3rd to 7th centuries CE.

== Discovery ==
Many previous exploratory missions had endeavoured to locate the city only to meet with failure. Excavations at the site, roughly in an area between the mortuary temple of Ramses III and that of Amenhotep III were carried out under the direction of Egyptian archaeologist Zahi Hawass, and began in September 2020, beginning with what turned out to be the southern quarters of the city. The city's remains were stumbled upon when Hawass and his team were searching for the remains of the funerary temple of Tutankhamun. The find turned out to reveal what appears to be the greatest administrative and industrial centre of that period.

It forms part of Amenhotep's palace complex (Malkata, also known originally as "the Dazzling Aten") lying just north of the new area. The confirmation of the discovery was announced by Hawass on 8 April 2021. Egyptologist Betsy Bryan hailed it as the most important archaeological discovery in Egypt since the excavation of the tomb of Tutankhamun.

== Structure ==
To date several distinct neighbourhoods, formed by zigzagging mudbrick walls, have been uncovered, including a bakery quarter, replete with items of everyday life and work related to the town's artistic and industrial life. Three distinct palaces have been identified. As of April 2021, the northern quarters and the town's cemetery have been located, but are unexcavated.

== Historical and Archaeological significance ==
The city of Aten was an improtant role in the economic and adminsitrtive activities of ancient Thebes during the reign of Amenhotep lll (c. 1390-1352 BCE). Located near the royal plalace complex of Malkatat and the pharaoh's mortuary temple, the settlement helped support the royal building program and religious institutions of the Eighteenth Dynasty. The Archaeological excavations have shows that there were wokrshops and production areas used to manufacture and make jewlery, more textles, leather goods, and other everyday utensils. They also discovered bakeries, food-processing facilities, storage vessels, and other residential buildings. These things found provided us wuth evidence of the daily activiites of the people who lived and worked in teh settlement. With all of these discoveries, there were also wine jar seals bearins inscriptions associated with the city's name.

== Maps ==
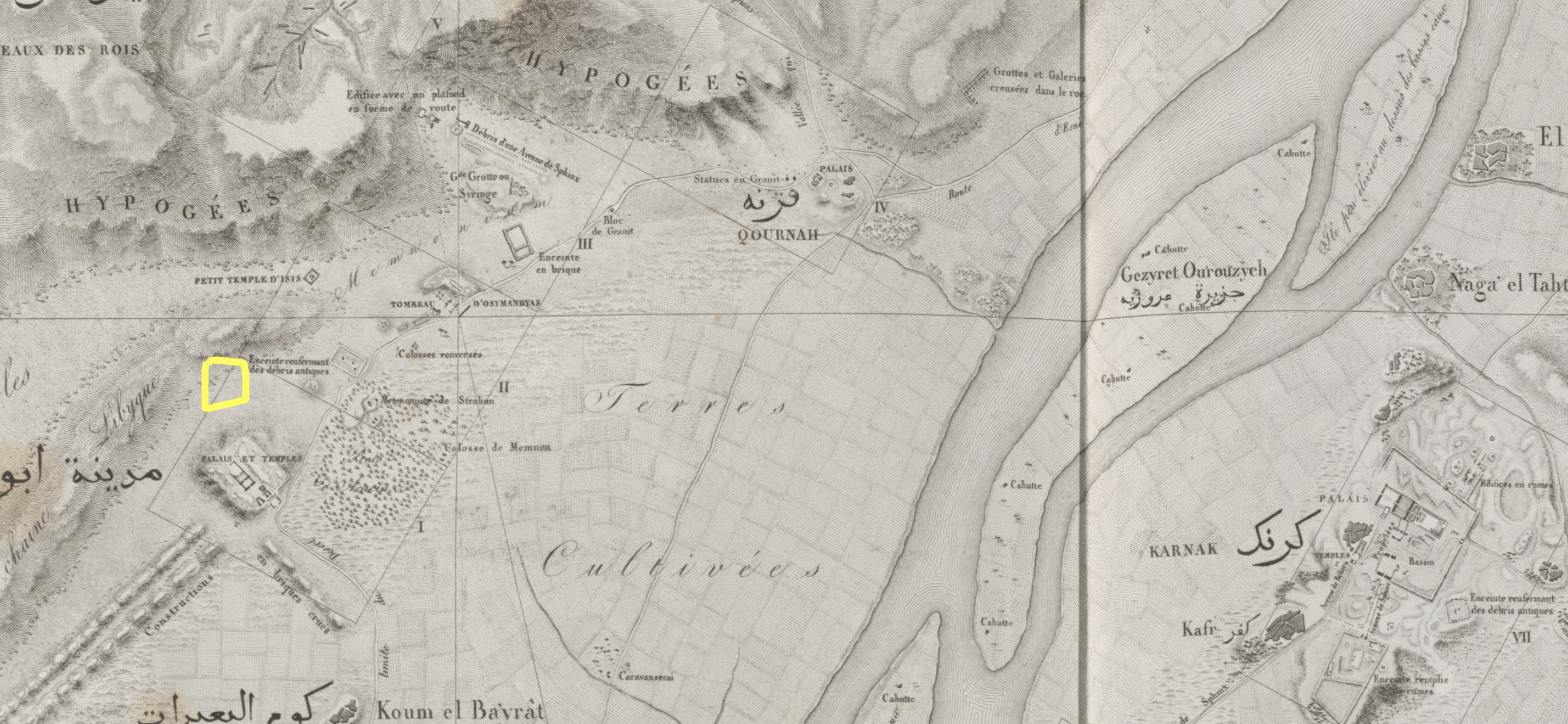
Location of the city of Aten, excavated in 2020–21, overlaid on the first detailed modern map of the area

== See also ==
- Malkata, also known as The Dazzling Aten

== Sources ==
- "3,000-year-old 'lost golden city' of ancient Egypt". The Guardian. Agence France-Presse. 9 April 2021.
- Alberti, Mia; Guy, Jack (9 April 2021). "Archaeologists discover 3,000-year-old Egyptian city, left 'as if it were yesterday'". CNN.
- Blakemore, Erin (8 April 2021). "'Lost golden city of Luxor' discovered by archaeologists in Egypt". National Geographic. Archived from the original on 8 April 2021.
- Cascone, Sarah (9 April 2021). "Archaeologists Have Discovered the Lost Pleasure City of Luxor, Long Fabled as the 'Egyptian Pompeii,' Stunningly Preserved in Time". Artnet.
- "Egypte: découverte d'une " Cité d'or perdue" vieille de 3 000 ans" [Egypt: discovery of a 3,000-year-old "lost city of gold"]. GEO (in French). Agence France-Presse. 9 April 2021.
- Giuliani, Tiziana (8 April 2021). "Zahi Hawass annuncia la scoperta di "Rise of Aten", la città di Amenhotep III, Akhenaton, Tut e Ay" [Zahi Hawass announces the discovery of "Rise of Aten", the city of Amenhotep III, Akhenaten, Tut and Ay] (in Italian). Mediterraneo antico.
- Hawass, Zahi (2021). "Excavations in Western Thebes, 2021: The Discovery of the Golden Lost City, A Preliminary Report". Journal of the American Research Center in Egypt. 57 (1): 83–110. doi:10.5913/jarce.57.2021.a005.
- Magdy, Samy (11 April 2021). "Archaeologist reveals details of 3,000-year-old lost city found in Egypt". ABC7NY. Associated Press. Archived from the original on 11 April 2021.
- Virtuani, Paolo (8 April 2021). "Egitto, scoperta l'antica città di Aten: "Il ritrovamento più importante dopo la tomba di Tutankhamon"" [Egypt, the ancient city of Aten discovered: "The most important discovery after Tutankhamun's tomb"]. Corriere della Sera (in Italian).
