= Malkata =

Archaeological site of Egypt

- Location within Egypt
- 25°42′55″N 32°35′28″E
- Type: Palace complex
- Periods: New Kingdom of Egypt
- Associated with: Amenhotep III; Tutankhamun
- Location: Luxor, Luxor Governorate, Egypt
- Region: Upper Egypt
- Part of: Theban Necropolis, Thebes

Site notes
- Excavation dates: Georges Daressy (1888); The Metropolitan Museum of Art (1910–1920); University Museum of Pennsylvania (1970s); The Archaeological Mission of Waseda University (1985)

Malkata (or Malqata; Arabic: الملقطة, lit. 'the place where (ancient) things are picked up'), is the site of an Ancient Egyptian palace complex built during the New Kingdom, by the 18th Dynasty pharaoh Amenhotep III. It is located on the West Bank of the Nile at Thebes, Upper Egypt, in the desert to the south of Medinet Habu. The site also included a temple dedicated to Amenhotep III's Great Royal Wife, Tiy, which honors Sobek, the crocodile deity.

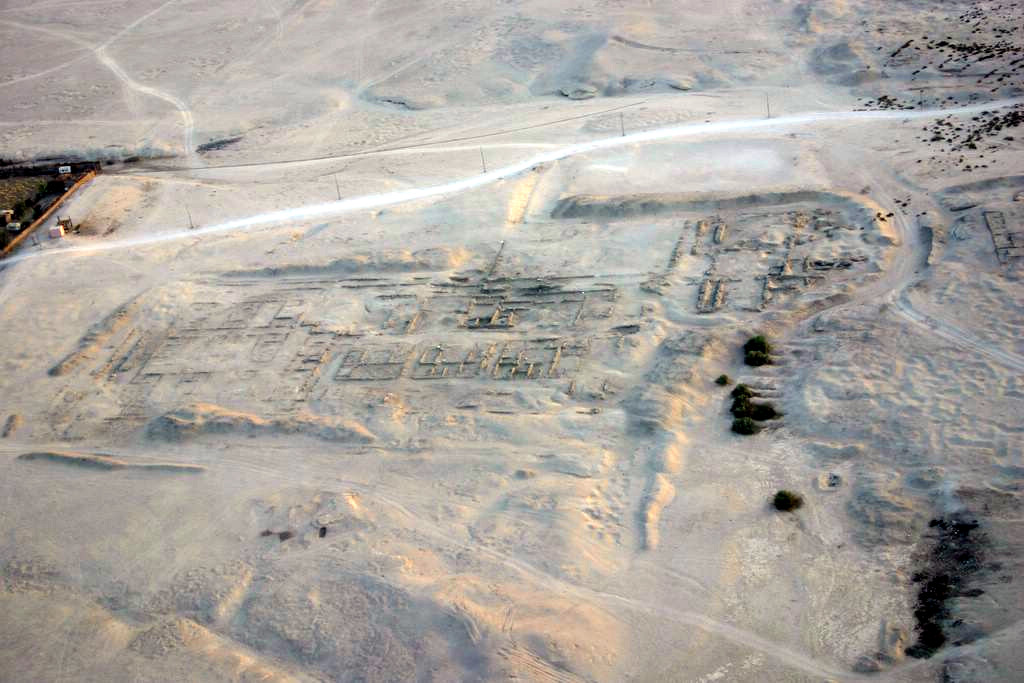
The ruins of the west villas of the Ancient Egyptian palace, Malkata; north is at the top.

== Royal Village ==
Malkata in hieroglyphs
Q3 N35 M17 V13 N35 N5 U33 V28 N35 S15
Pn-ṯḥn-Jtn
The Dazzling Aten

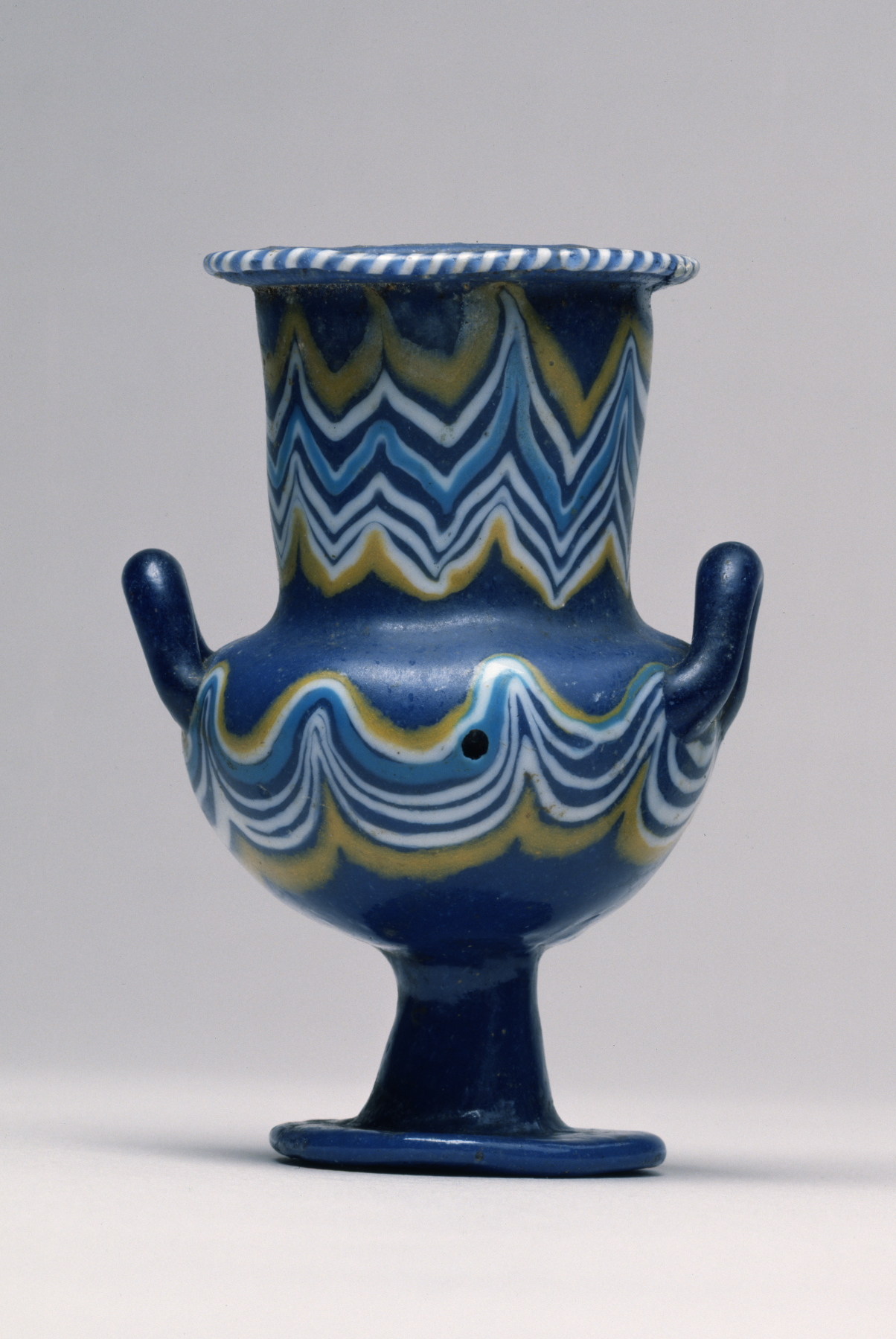
Polychrome glass vase from Malkata. Walters Art Museum. The city had an extensive glass industry, the first in Egypt

There are various structures in the desert, consisting of several residential palaces, a temple of Amun, a festival hall, elite villas, houses for the relatives of the royal family, apartments for attendants, and a desert altar termed the Kom al-Samak, all of which were constructed of mud bricks.

== Festivals At Malkata ==
As stated by Jennifer Houser Wegner, this site contained a large manmade lake expanding 2.5 km. This Lake was believed to be part of Amenhotep III's sed festival ritual wherein the pharaoh becomes one with the god Re. Theses festivals took place during the years 30, 34, and 37. These festivals took place for months and expanded across Egypt.

== Royal Palace of Amenhotep III ==
The royal palace was built in the 14th century BC and its ancient name was Per-Hai, "House of Rejoicing" or the Palace of the Dazzling Aten, which was one of Amenhotep III's royal epithets. Built mostly out of mud-brick, it was Amenhotep's residence throughout most of the later part of his reign. Construction began around year 11 of his reign and continued until the king moved there permanently around his year 29. Once completed, it was the largest royal residence in Egypt.

To the east of the palace a large ceremonial lake was dug. The palace area was connected to the Nile through a system of canals, which end in a large harbour or quay, now called Birket Habu (Hapu's Lake). While excavating the Birket Habu Egyptologists David O'Connor and Barry Kemp discovered fragments of painted wall plaster from a palace they termed Site K. This palace had apparently been demolished when the lake was built in the last decade of Amenhotep III's reign. These fragments of painted decoration are significant as their artistic style closely resembled that of the Minoan civilization, similar to those found at the earlier Thutmosid palace of Tell el-Dab’a in the Delta. Birket Habu was used as an important feature of Amenhotep III's heb-sed festival in year 30 of his reign; it was also used as a super highway as it was connected to the Nile. The manmade lake acted as a location for goods and transportation being brought to Malkata.

=== Layout of the palace ===
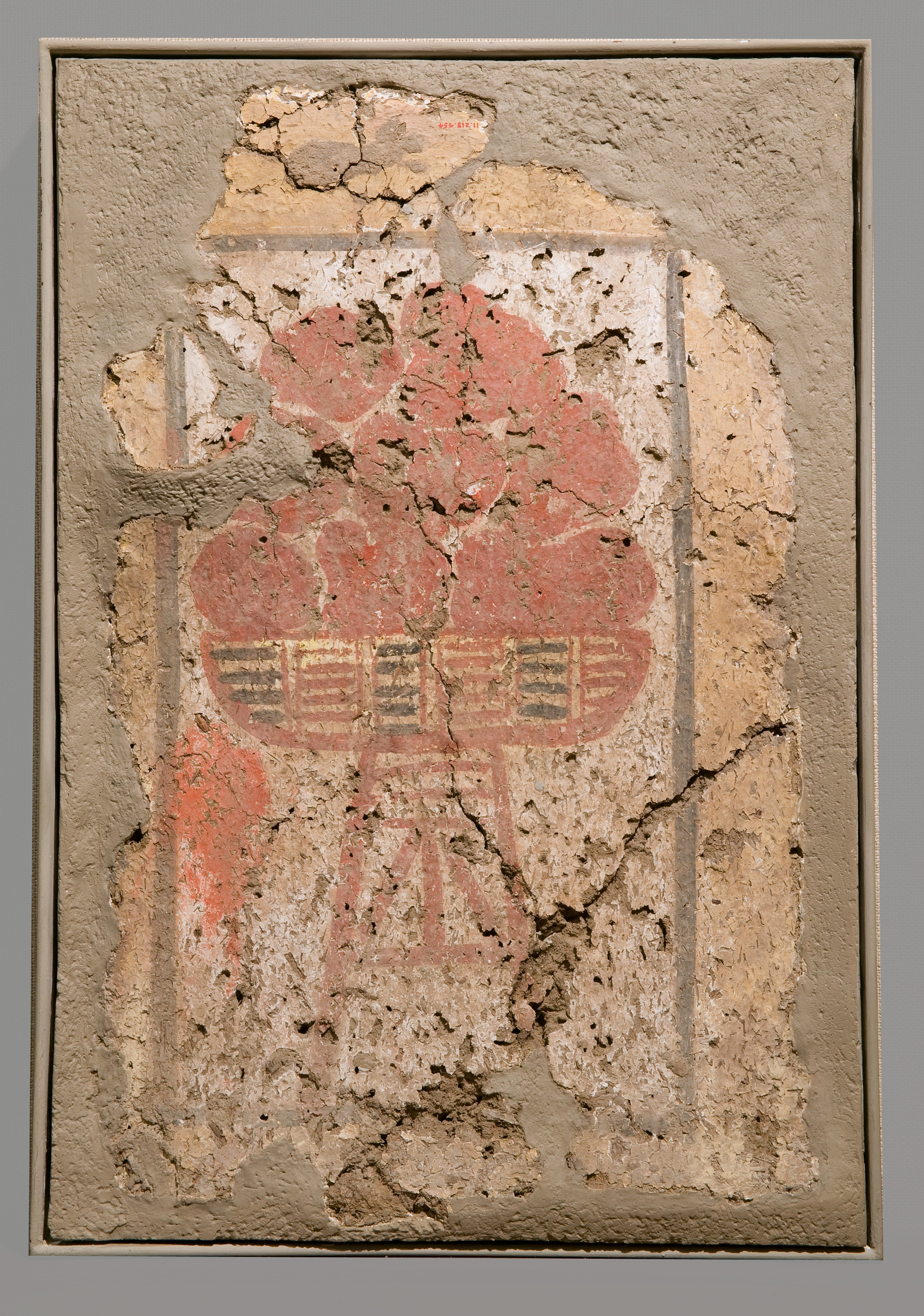
Painted bench end-panel at Malkata depicting a fruit bowl. In the collection of the Metropolitan Museum of Art

The palace contained many audience halls, central halls, courtyards, villas, smaller palace complexes for the royal family, and apartments for officials. The harbor and canal connected the palace with the Nile, allowing easy travel across the river to the city of Thebes, which was situated on the eastern bank. There is little evidence of this lake today but the foundations of the palace itself remain.

The royal apartment featured a bedroom, a dressing room, a private audience chamber, and a harem, which, after the reign of Amenhotep III, was used simply for storage. The palace had a central courtyard, and across from the pharaoh's rooms were apartments for his daughters and son. His Great Royal Wife, Tiye, had her own smaller palace complex diagonally across from the pharaoh's. The palace grounds contained gardens and a large pleasure lake.

Remains exist of a temple of Amun to the north of the palace, within the complex. A "desert altar" on the outskirts of the ruins has also been excavated. Remains of a temple to the goddess Isis lie south of the main palace complex.

Malkata was managed by a veritable army of servants and staff. Remains of kitchens near the royal chamber have been found, as well as servant quarters. The palace resembled a complete city, with officials in charge of different sections, such as the gardens and the different apartments and quarters.

=== Palace decorations ===
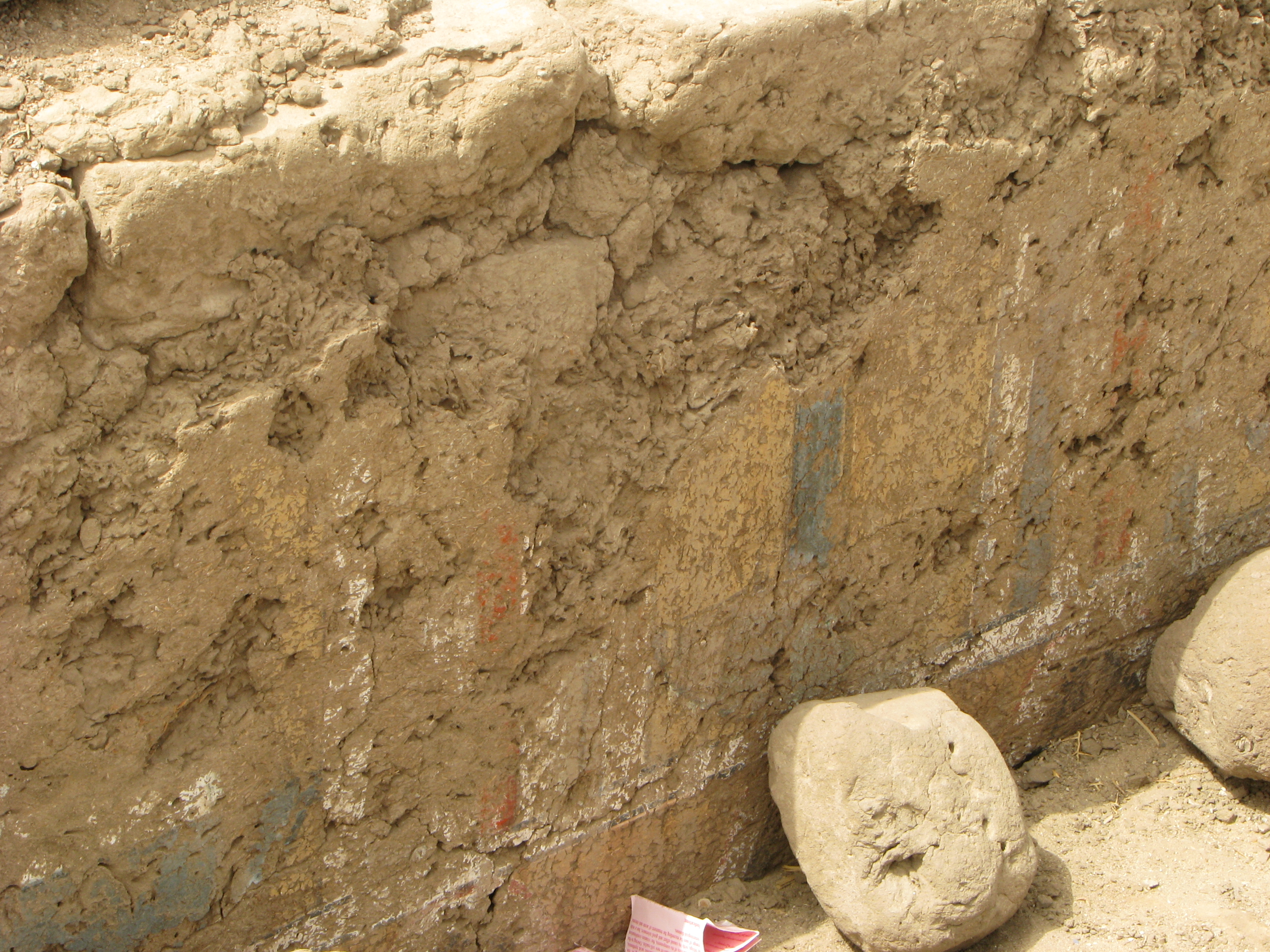
Traces of wall painting on plastered mudbrick wall at Malkata

Fragments of plastered wall paintings have given archaeologists a glimpse of how the palace was decorated. Various paintings of the goddess Nekhbet made up the ceiling of the royal bedchamber. The walls, ceiling, and floors were painted with scenes of wildlife - flowers, reeds, and animals in the marshes, as well as geometric designs, complete with rosettes. Ornate wooden columns painted to resemble lilies supported the ceilings. Rare traces of original wall paintings are still visible on site, despite the badly ruined state of the mudbrick walls.

=== History of the palace ===
The palace seems to have been begun by Amenhotep III in the early 14th century BC and the site was occupied as late as the Roman-Byzantine Period. This may well make it one of the longest-used royal palaces in the world, as it would have been occupied for a span of 14-19 centuries. Malkata was most definitely Amenhotep's main residence near Thebes, the capital of ancient Egypt, and therefore, probably his main palace in all of the country. Remains of other smaller palaces in Thebes and other cities throughout Egypt have been found, but none were as large as Amenhotep's palace at Malkata.

Malkata was abandoned by Akhenaten, Amenhotep III's son and successor when he moved the capital to his new city at Amarna, perhaps in order to break the influence of the powerful priests of the Temple of Amun. However, it may have been re-inhabited by the youthful Tutankhamen, when the traditional religion and capital were restored and the priests of the temple regained their influence in the interwoven religion and government of Ancient Egypt.

Tutankhamen's successor, Ay, probably inhabited the palace briefly, and pharaoh Horemheb after him as well, but by the ascension of Ramesses II, it was simply a minor residence, as the capital was moved to Pi-Ramesses in the far north.

=== Excavations ===
The palace ruins were excavated several times: in 1888 by Daressy; by the Metropolitan Museum of Art in 1910–1920; by University Museum of Pennsylvania in the 1970s; and since 1985, they have been the site of excavations by the Archaeological Mission of Waseda University. The MET excavated for 6 more seasons from 1919-1920.

== Deir el-Shelwit ==
=== Temple of Isis ===
Just south of the palace there is a temple devoted to Isis which was built in the Roman period. The modern name for this temple is Deir al-Shalwi.

=== Roman settlement and cemetery ===
Excavations of the area by the Waseda team unearthed the remains of a Roman settlement and cemetery, finding remains from the times of Trajan and Hadrian.

== Malkata today ==
Next to the site is a modern village. Here there is a tiny church and monastery dedicated to Saint Theodore Stratelates, also called Tawdros (or Tadros) of Shotep (AD 281-319).

== See also ==
- Malqata Menat
- Aten (city), also known as The Dazzling Aten.
