= TT391 =

Tomb of ancient Egypt

Theban tomb TT391
- Burial site of Karabasken and later of Pedubast
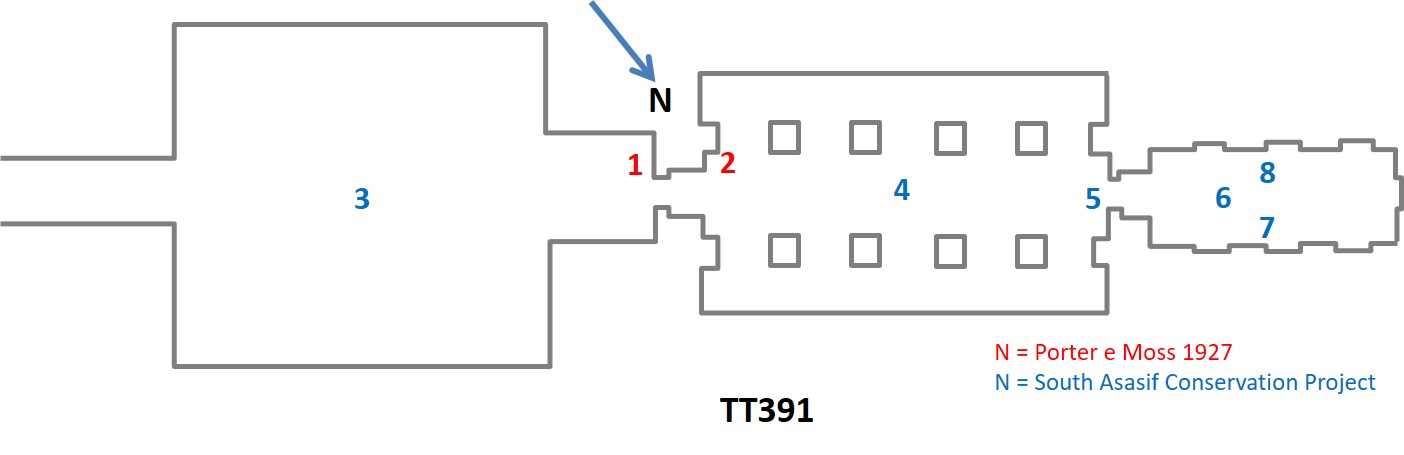
- Plan of TT391

- Location within Egypt
- Location: South El-Assasif, Theban Necropolis
- Discovered: 1820
- ← Previous; TT390 Next → TT392

The Theban Tomb TT391 is located in South El-Assasif, part of the Theban Necropolis, on the west bank of the Nile, Egypt, opposite to Luxor. It is the burial place of the ancient Egyptian mayor of Thebes and fourth priest of Amun Karabasken, who lived during the reign of the 25th Dynasty pharaohs Piye and Shabaka. The tomb itself was built around 715–705 BCE under Shebitku, and it is the earliest one in South El-Assasif. It was first discovered in 1820 by John Gardner Wilkinson, Robert Hay and James Burton, then by Karl Richard Lepsius; it was reopened in 2001.

In August 2015, an excavation led by Elena Pischikova discovered that the tomb was later partially redecorated and reused for the Overseer of Upper Egypt Pedubast, who lived during the 26th Dynasty.

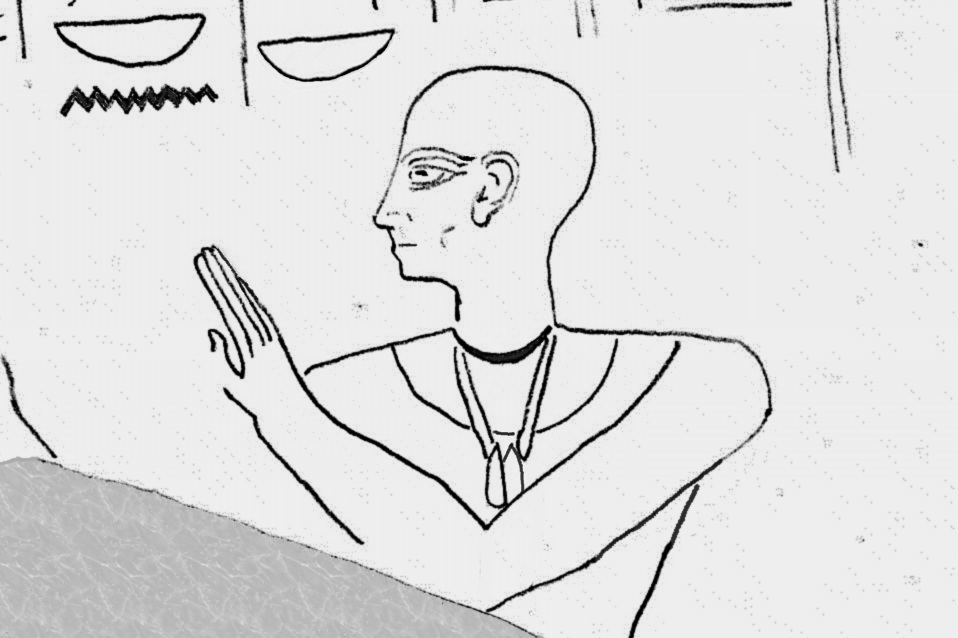
Sketch of a relief from TT391, depicting Pedubast

== See also ==
- List of Theban tombs
