= Avenue of Sphinxes =

Archaeological site in Luxor, Egypt

Coordinates: 25°42′28″N 32°38′54″E

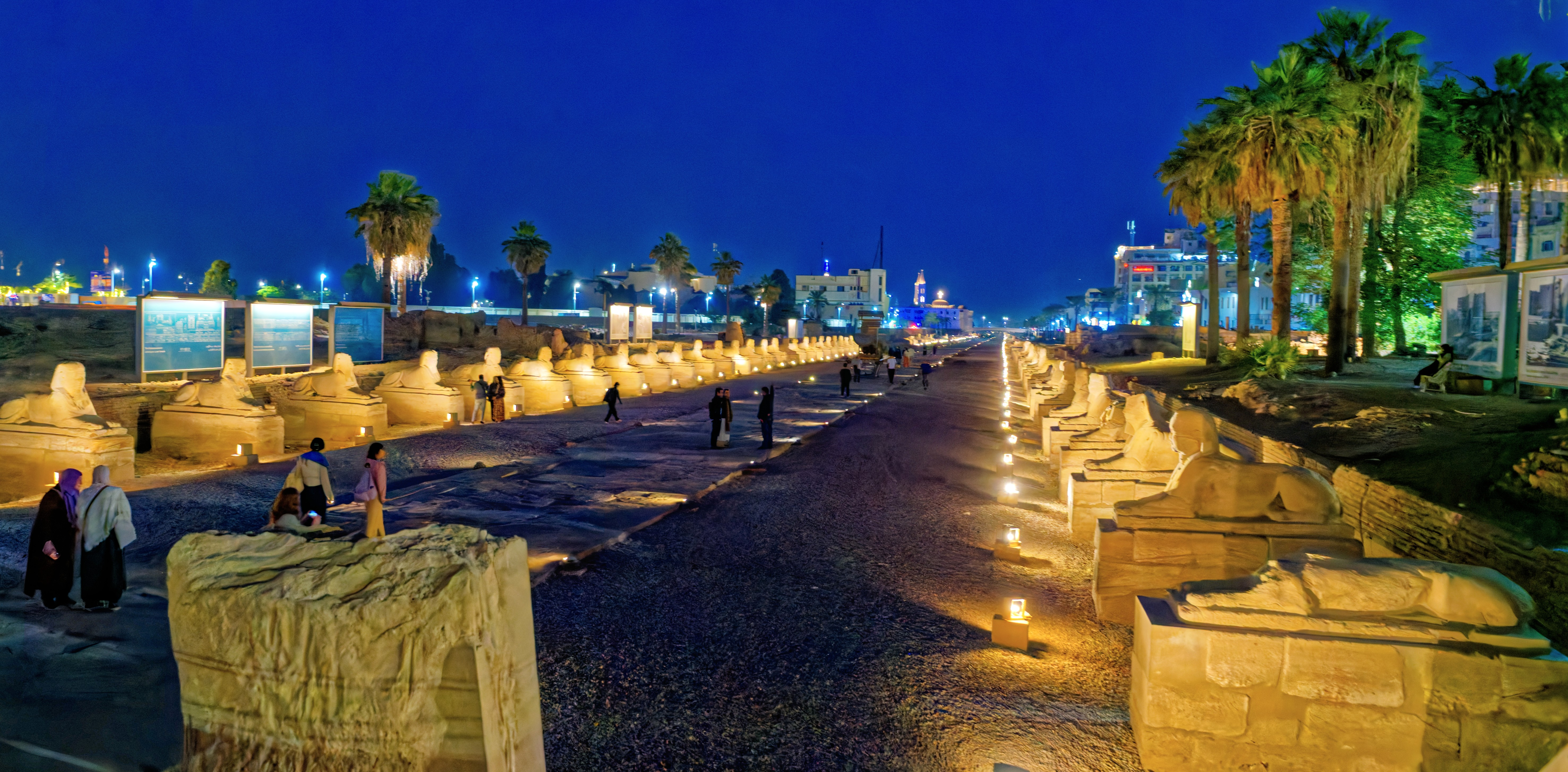
The Avenue of Sphinxes in 2025

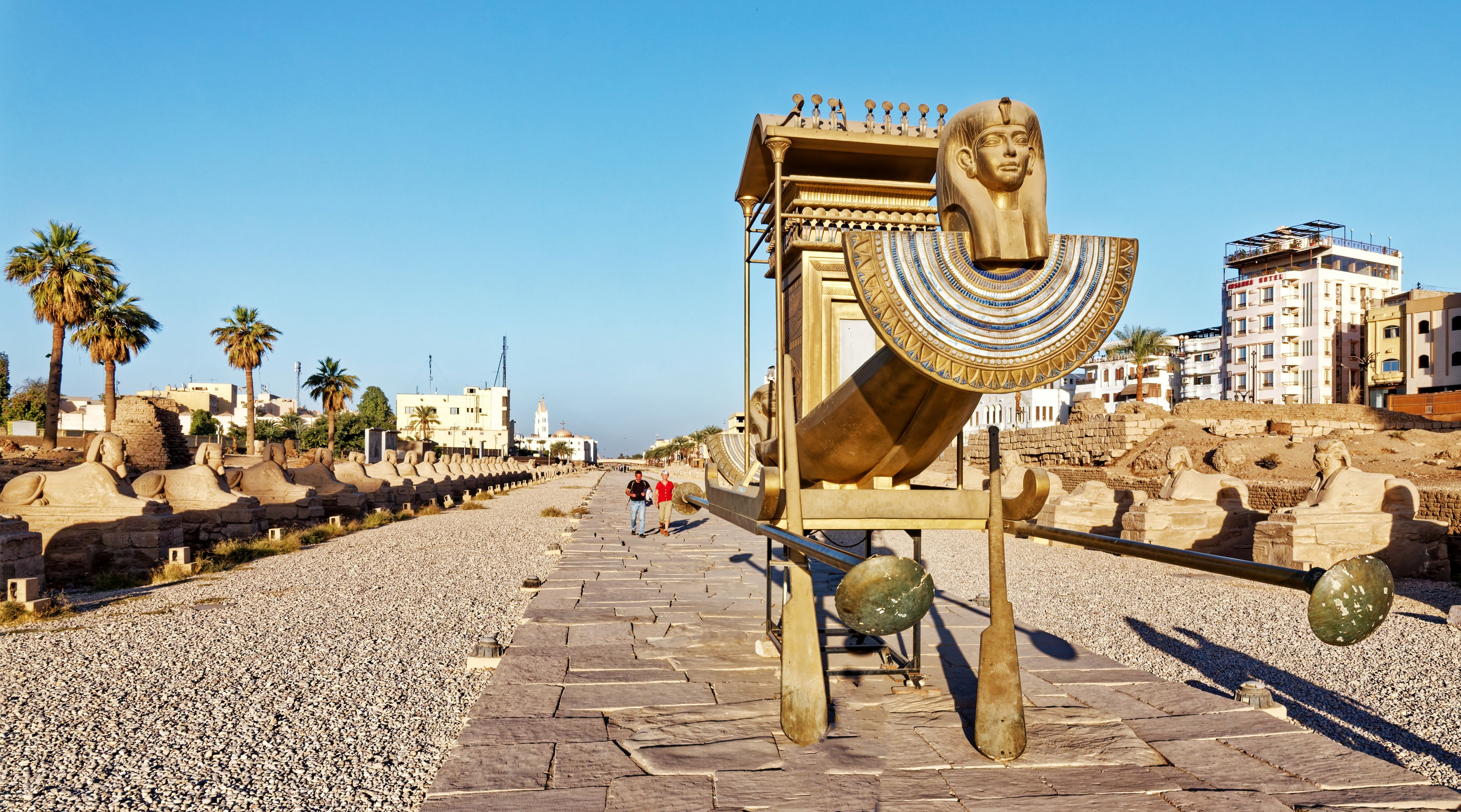
The Avenue of Sphinxes

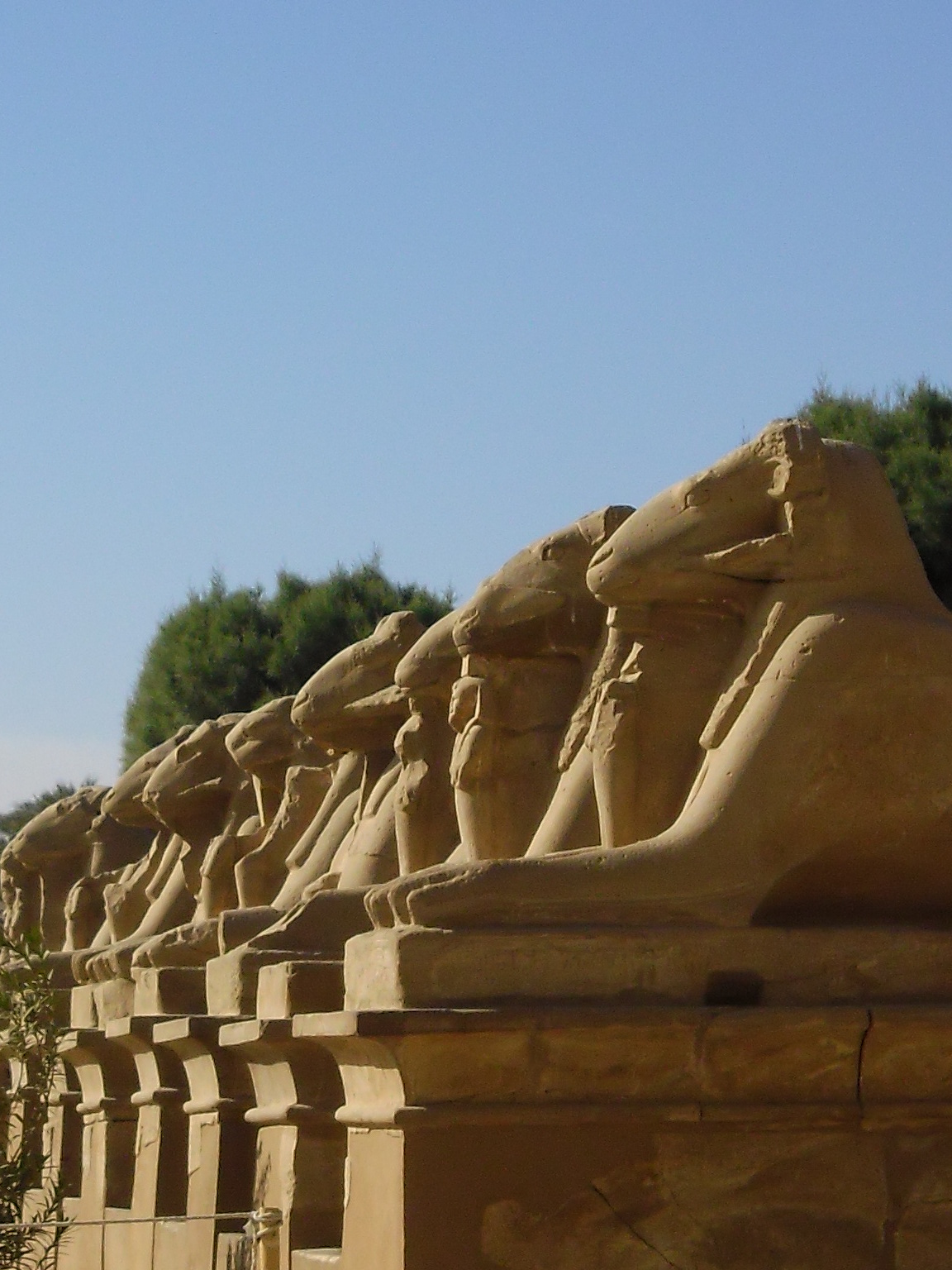
The King’s Festivities Road

Avenue of Sphinxes or The King's Festivities Road, also known as Rams Road (Arabic: طريق الكباش), is a 2.7 km (1.7 mi) long avenue (dromos) which connects Karnak Temple with Luxor Temple having been uncovered in the ancient city of Thebes (modern Luxor), with sphinxes and ram-headed statues lined up on both flanks.

== History ==
Construction of the Avenue of Sphinxes began during the New Kingdom era and was completed during the Late period during the reign of 30th Dynasty ruler Nectanebo I (380–362 B.C.), the road was later buried under layers of sand over the centuries.

In Description de l'Égypte (1809) the Avenue of Sphinxes is described as 2,000 meters long, lined with over 600 sphinxes.

Georges Daressy reported in 1893 that at Luxor the road is buried and couldn't be excavated because it lay below the groundwater level, whereas at Karnak nearly a kilometer of it is visible.

The first trace of the avenue (at Luxor) was found in 1949 when Egyptian archaeologist Mohammed Zakaria Ghoneim discovered eight statues near the Luxor Temple with 17 more statues uncovered from 1958 to 1961 and 55 unearthed from 1961 to 1964 all within a perimeter of 250 meters. From 1984 to 2000, the entire route of the walkway was finally determined, leaving it to excavators to uncover the road. The original 1,057 statues are along the way, and they are divided into three shapes:

- The first shape is a lion's body with a ram's head erected on an area of approximately 1,000 feet between the Karnak temple and the Precinct of Mut during the reign of the ruler of the New Kingdom Tutankhamun.
- The second shape is a full ram statue, built in a remote area during the eighteenth dynasty of Amenhotep III, before being transferred later to the Karnak complex.
- The third shape which includes the largest part of the statues is a statue of the Sphinx (body of a lion and head of a human), the statues extend over a mile to Luxor Temple.

== Renovation and Grand Reopening ==
On 25 November 2021, the avenue was opened to the public having concluded restoration works that took over seven decades to complete. The opening ceremonies consisted of a parade that featured participants in pharaonic dress, a symphony orchestra, lighting effects, professional dancers, boats on the Nile and horse drawn carriages. Three golden pharaonic-style model boats dedicated to the ancient sun god Amun Ra, moon god Khonsu and mother goddess Mut were carried by men in sheer gold and black robes. The vision for this event was created by a team under the German University in Cairo. Egyptian President Abdel Fattah el-Sisi attended the city-wide spectacle. By that time, the avenue was lined with 1057 statues in total including 807 sphinx-shaped and 250 others with a ram-shaped head.

Zahi Hawass called the Luxor site "the largest open [air] museum, the largest archeological site in the world that tells the history of Egypt from the 2,000 BC era known as the Dynasty XI — until the Roman Period."
