= Nespamedu =

Ancient Egyptian vizier

- Vizier of the South
- Dynasty: 25th Dynasty
- Burial: Abydos Tomb D13
- Spouse: Iretrau
- Children: Nespaqashuty D

Nespamedu was an ancient Egyptian Vizier who officiated during the 25th Dynasty during the reign of Taharqa. Nespamedu followed his father Nespaqashuty C as vizier.

== Biography ==
Nespamedu was the son of the Vizier Nespaqashuty C and his wife Takhaenbast. Nespamedu's wife was the Chief attendant of the Divine Adoratrice of Amun, Iretrau (TT390) and they had a son named Nespaqashuty (D), named after his grandfather.

== Burial ==
Nespamedu was buried in Abydos, unlike his wife Iretrau, and his son the Vizier Nespaqashuty D, who had tombs in Thebes. Nespamedu was buried in tomb D57 in Abydos, and two magical bricks from this tomb are now in the Oriental Institute Museum in Chicago. One brick had an indentation where an Anubis jackal figure would have rested (OIM 6330), while another brick would have held a Djed pillar (OIM 6401). Both bricks were made out of clay mixed with what appears to be incense. This matched the instruction from the Book of the Dead text inscribed on the brick.
