= Georges Daressy =

French Egyptologist (1864-1938)

Georges Émile Jules Daressy (19 March 1864 – 28 February 1938) was a French Egyptologist.

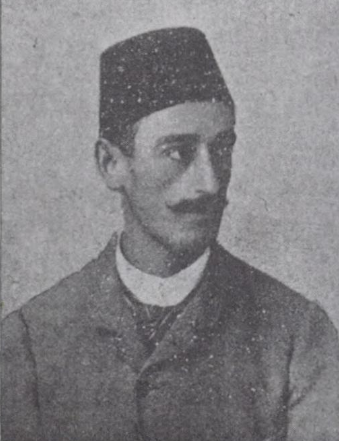
The portrait of Georges Daressy

He worked from 1887 in the Egyptian Museum in Cairo. Amongst his responsibilities was the museum's move from Bulaq to Giza in 1891, and then to the present-day location in 1901. He is an author of the general catalog of the museum. He was the first Egyptologist to publish (1901) and translate (1906) the Akhmim wooden tablets.

He excavated throughout Egypt, most notably in the Valley of the Kings, Medinet Habu, Karnak, Luxor, Malkata and Abydos.

== Publications ==
- Notice explicative des ruines du temple de Louxor, Le Caire, 1893.
- Notice explicative des ruines du temple de Médinet Habu, Le Caire, 1897.
- Le mastaba de Mera, 1898.
- Ostraca, Le Caire : Imprimerie de l'Inst. Franc̜ais d'Archéologie Orientale, 1901, (Catalogue général des antiquités égyptiennes du Musée du Caire).
- Fouilles de la Vallée des Rois <1898-1899>, Le Caire : Imprimerie de l'Inst. Franc̜ais d'Archéologie Orientale, 1902, (Catalogue général des antiquités égyptiennes du Musée du Caire).
- Textes et dessins magiques, Le Caire : Imprimerie de l'Inst. Franc̜ais d'Archéologie Orientale, 1903, (Catalogue général des antiquités égyptiennes du Musée du Caire).
- La faune momifée de l'antique Egypte, Le Caire : Imprimerie de l'Inst. Franc̜ais d'Archéologie Orientale, 1905, (Catalogue général des antiquités égyptiennes du Musée du Caire).
- Statues de divinités, Le Caire : Imprimerie de l'Inst. Franc̜ais d'Archéologie Orientale, 1905–1906, (Catalogue général des antiquités égyptiennes du Musée du Caire).
- Calculs Egyptiens du Moyen Empire, Recueil de Travaux Relatifs De La Philologie et l'Archéologie Egyptiennes et Assyriennes XXVIII, 1906, 62–72.
- Cercueils des cachettes royales, Le Caire : Imprimerie de l'Inst. Franc̜ais d'Archéologie Orientale, 1909, (Catalogue général des antiquités égyptiennes du Musée du Caire).
- The tomb of queen Tîyi : Catalogue of the objects discovered, London, 1910, (Theodore M. Davis' Excavations : Bibân el Molûk).
- A brief description of the principal monuments exhibited in the Egyptian Museum, Cairo, Cairo : Press of the French Institute of Oriental Archaeology, 1922, 3. Auflage 1925.
