= Thebes, Egypt =

Ancient Egyptian city

Thebes
- Waset طيبة; Θῆβαι
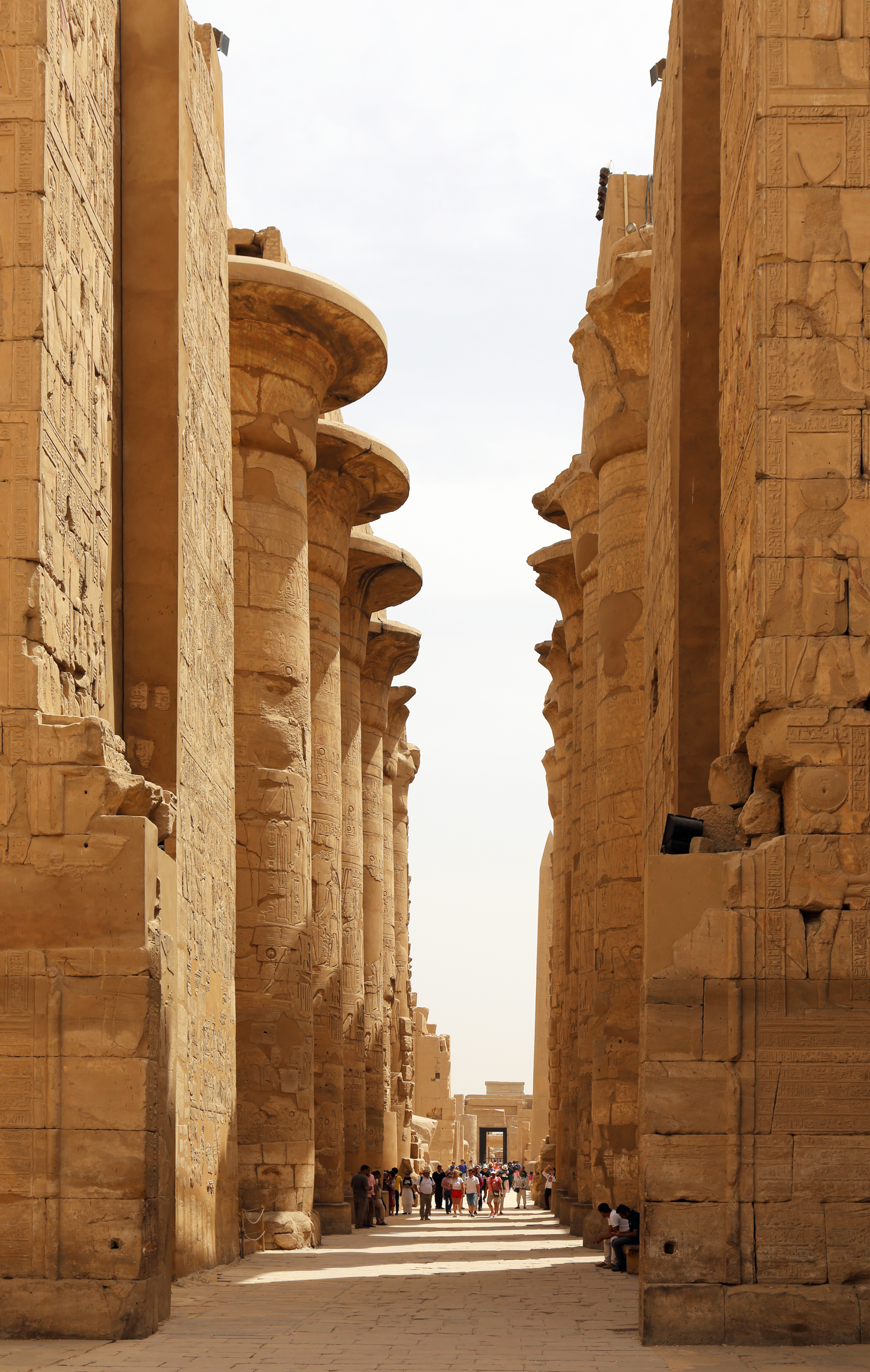
- Hypostyle Hall

- Location within Egypt
- 25°43′14″N 32°36′37″E
- Type: Settlement
- Location: Luxor, Luxor Governorate, Egypt
- Region: Upper Egypt

Site notes
- Condition: In ruins

UNESCO World Heritage Site
- Official name: Ancient Thebes with its Necropolis
- Type: Cultural
- Criteria: I, III, VI
- Designated: 1979 (3rd session)
- Reference no.: 87
- Region: Egypt

Thebes (Egyptian Arabic: طيبه, romanized: ṭība), known to the ancient Egyptians as Waset, was an ancient Egyptian city located along the Nile about 800 kilometers (500 mi) south of the Mediterranean. Its ruins lie within the modern Egyptian city of Luxor. Thebes was the main city of the fourth Upper Egyptian nome (Sceptre nome) and was the capital of Egypt for long periods during the Middle Kingdom and New Kingdom eras.

The city was close to Nubia and the Eastern Desert, with its valuable mineral resources and trade routes. It was a religious center and the most venerated city during many periods of ancient Egyptian history.

The site of Thebes includes areas on both the eastern bank of the Nile, where the temples of Karnak and Luxor stand and where the city was situated; and the western bank, where a necropolis of large private and royal cemeteries and funerary complexes can be found. In 1979, the ruins of ancient Thebes were classified by UNESCO as a World Heritage Site.

== Toponymy ==
R19 t niwt wꜣs.t "City of the Scepter" in hieroglyphs	niwt t Z1 M24 t njw.t rs.t "Southern City" in hieroglyphs	iwn nw niwt M27 niwt jwnw-smꜥ "Heliopolis of the South" in hieroglyphs

The Egyptian name for Thebes was wꜣs.t, "City of the wꜣs", the sceptre of the pharaohs, a long staff with an animal's head and a forked base. From the end of the New Kingdom, Thebes was known in Egyptian as njw.t-jmn, the "City of Amun", the chief of the Theban Triad of deities whose other members were Mut and Khonsu. This name of Thebes appears in the Tanakh as the "Nōʼ ʼĀmôn" (נא אמון) in the Book of Nahum and also as "No" (נא) mentioned in the Book of Ezekiel and Jeremiah.

"Thebes" is sometimes claimed to be the Latinised form of Ancient Greek: Θῆβαι, the hellenized form of Demotic Egyptian tꜣ jpt ("the temple"), referring to jpt-swt. Today, the temple is known as Karnak, and is located on the northeast bank of the city. Since Homer refers to the metropolis by this name, and since Demotic script did not appear until a later date, the etymology is doubtful. As early as Homer's Iliad, the Greeks distinguished the Egyptian Thebes as "Thebes of the Hundred Gates" (Θῆβαι ἑκατόμπυλοι, Thēbai hekatómpyloi) or "Hundred-Gated Thebes", as opposed to the "Thebes of the Seven Gates" (Θῆβαι ἑπτάπυλοι, Thēbai heptápyloi) in Boeotia, Greece. (Note: Pausanias records that owing to its "connection" with the Egyptian city, the Boeotian Thebes also had an idol and temple of Amun from the 5th century BC.)

In the interpretatio graeca, Amun was rendered as Zeus Ammon. The name was therefore translated into Greek as Diospolis, "City of Zeus". To distinguish it from the numerous other cities by this name, it was known as the "Great Diospolis" (Διόσπολις Μεγάλη, Diospolis Megálē; Latin: Diospolis Magna). The Greek names came into wider use after the conquest of Egypt by Alexander the Great, when the country came to be ruled by the Macedonian Ptolemaic dynasty.

== Characteristics ==
=== Geography ===
Thebes was located along the banks of the Nile River in the middle part of Upper Egypt about 800 km south of the Delta. It was built largely on the alluvial plains of the Nile Valley, which follows a great bend of the Nile. Approximately 4,000 years ago, a significant change in the geography of the Nile River occurred in the Theban region, involving an expansion of the floodplain that increased the availability of arable land. This environmental transformation likely contributed to the agricultural productivity that supported the prosperity and stability of ancient Egyptian civilization during the Second Intermediate Period and New Kingdom onward. As a natural consequence, the city was laid in a northeast–southwest axis parallel to the contemporary river channel. Thebes had an area of 93 km^{2} (36 sq mi), which included parts of the Theban Hills in the west that culminates at the sacred 420-meter (1,380-foot) al-Qurn. In the east lies the mountainous Eastern Desert with its wadis draining into the valley. Significant among these wadis is Wadi Hammamat near Thebes. It was used as an overland trade route going to the Red Sea coast. Wadi Hammamat was the primary trade route linking Egypt to the Red Sea since Pre-Dynastic times. During the 4th millennium BCE, elements of the Uruk civilization were transmitted to Egypt along this corridor. It is likely that Thinis, the capital of the First Dynasty, was located in the same region as Thebes for this reason. Both cities were at a crossroad region in Upper Egypt between the Nile in the north to south direction and Saharan caravan routes connecting to Red Sea maritime routes via Wadi Hammamat in the East West direction. The Wadi el-Hol is also located near Thebes; this valley connected Thebes to an oasis on the Western Desert. It is notable for the first Proto-Sinatic alphabet inscription, which appeared shortly after Thebes became the capital of Egypt.

Nearby towns in the fourth Upper Egyptian nome were Per-Hathor, Madu, Djerty, Iuny, Sumenu and Imiotru.

=== Demographics ===
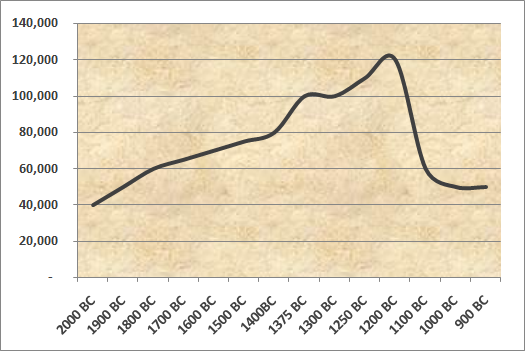
Population of Thebes 2000–900 BC

According to George Modelski, Thebes had about 40,000 inhabitants in 2000 BC (compared to 60,000 in Memphis, the largest city in the world at the time). By 1800 BC, the population of Memphis was down to about 30,000, making Thebes the largest city in Egypt at the time. Historian Ian Morris has estimated that by 1500 BC, Thebes may have grown to be the largest city in the world, with a population of about 75,000, a position it held until about 900 BC, when it was surpassed by Nimrud (among others).

Shomarka Keita reported that a 2005 study on mummified remains found that "some Theban nobles had a histology which indicated notably dark skin".

=== Economy ===
The archaeological remains of Thebes offer a striking testimony to Egyptian civilization at its height. The Greek poet Homer extolled the wealth of Thebes in the Iliad, Book 9 (c. 8th Century BC): "... in Egyptian Thebes the heaps of precious ingots gleam, the hundred-gated Thebes."

=== Culture ===
More than sixty annual festivals were celebrated in Thebes. The major festivals among these, according to the Edfu Geographical Text, were: the Beautiful Feast of Opet, the Khoiak (Festival), Festival of I Shemu, and Festival of II Shemu. Another popular festivity was the halloween-like Beautiful Festival of the Valley.

== History ==
=== Old Kingdom ===
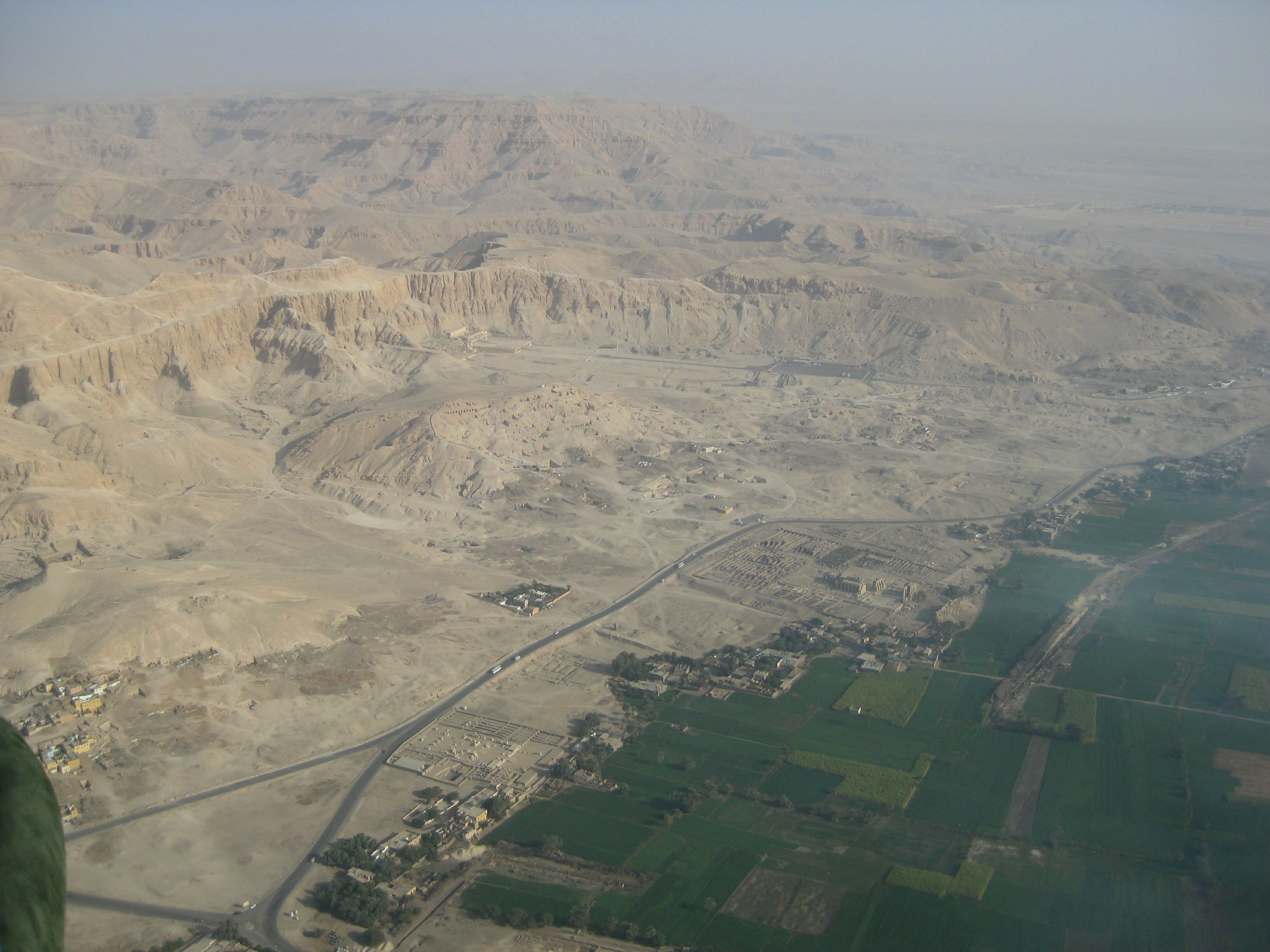
The Theban Necropolis

Thebes was inhabited from around 3200 BC. It was the eponymous capital of Waset, the fourth Upper Egyptian nome. At this time it was still a small trading post, while Memphis served as the royal residence of the Old Kingdom pharaohs. Although no buildings survive in Thebes older than portions of the Karnak temple complex that may date from the Middle Kingdom, the lower part of a statue of Pharaoh Nyuserre of the 5th Dynasty has been found in Karnak. Another statue dedicated by the 12th Dynasty king Senusret may have been usurped and re-used, since the statue bears a cartouche of Nyuserre on its belt. Since seven rulers of the 4th to 6th Dynasties appear on the Karnak king list, perhaps at the least there was a temple in the Theban area that dated to the Old Kingdom.

=== First Intermediate Period ===
By 2160 BC, a new line of pharaohs (the Ninth and Tenth Dynasties) consolidated control over Lower Egypt and northern parts of Upper Egypt from their capital in Herakleopolis Magna. A rival line (the Eleventh Dynasty), based at Thebes, ruled the remaining part of Upper Egypt. The Theban rulers were apparently descendants of the prince of Thebes, Intef the Elder. His probable grandson Intef I was the first of the family to claim in life a partial pharaonic titulary, though his power did not extend much further than the general Theban region.

=== Middle Kingdom ===
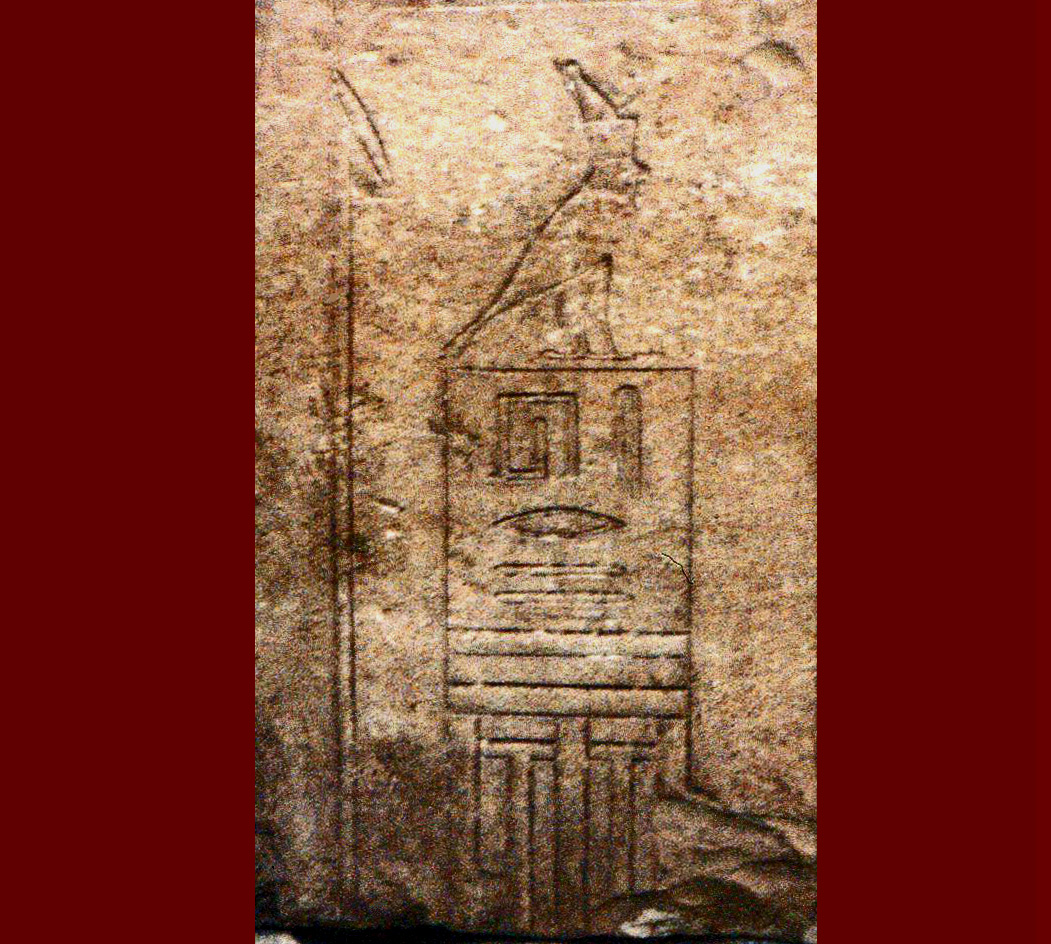
Serekh of Intef I inscribed posthumously for him by Mentuhotep II

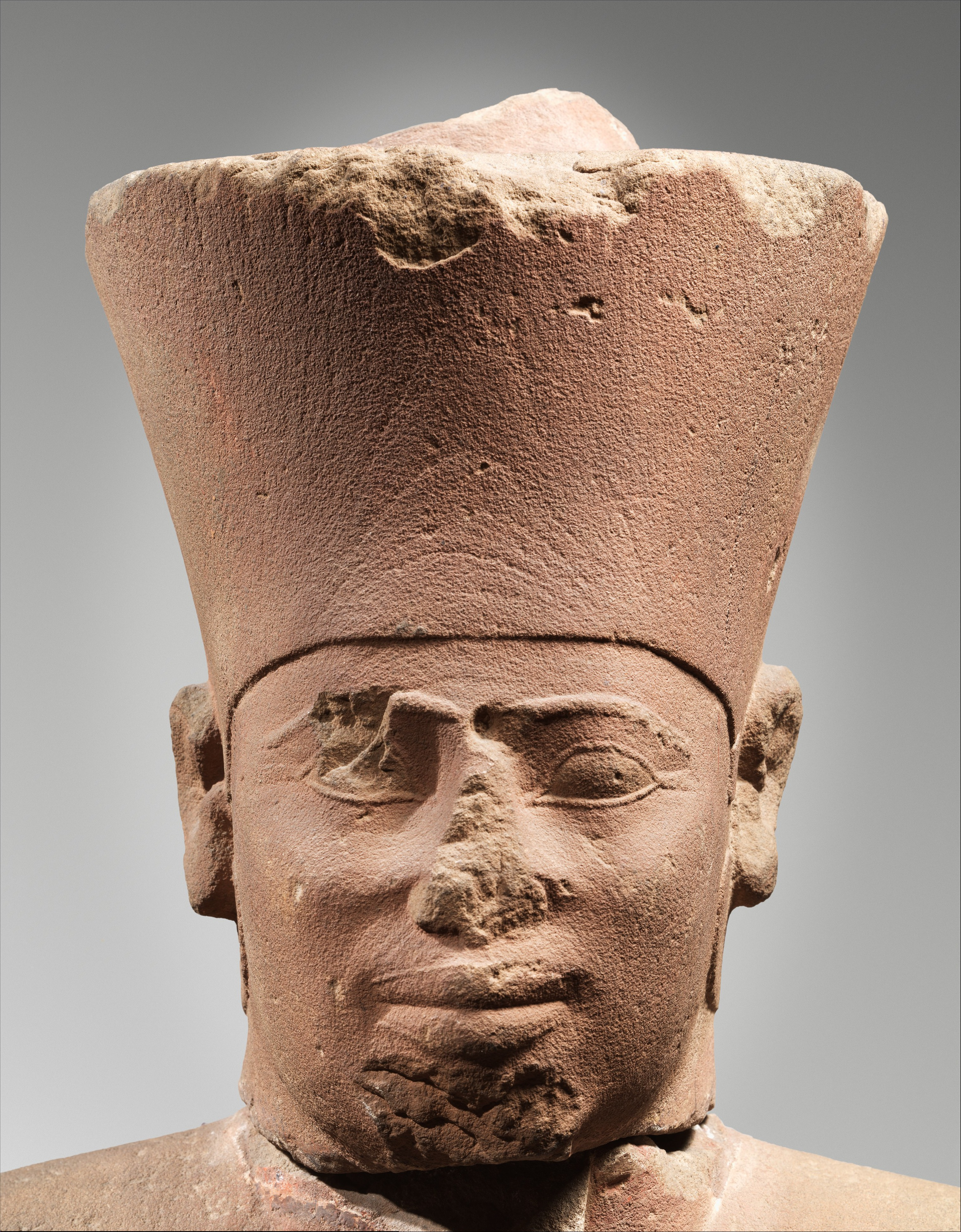
Statue of Mentuhotep II, 11th dynasty ruler, originated from Thebes, southern Egypt.

Finally by c. 2050 BC, Intef III's son Mentuhotep II (meaning "Montu is satisfied"), took the Herakleopolitans by force and reunited Egypt once again under one ruler, thereby starting the period now known as the Middle Kingdom. Mentuhotep II ruled for 51 years and built the first mortuary temple at Deir el-Bahri, which most likely served as the inspiration for the later and larger temple built next to it by Hatshepsut in the 18th Dynasty. After these events, the 11th Dynasty was short-lived, as less than twenty years had elapsed between the death of Mentuhotep II and that of Mentuhotep IV, in mysterious circumstances.

During the 12th Dynasty, Amenemhat I moved the seat of power North to Itjtawy. Thebes continued to thrive as a religious center as the local god Amun was becoming increasingly prominent throughout Egypt. The oldest remains of a temple dedicated to Amun date to the reign of Senusret I. Thebes was already, in the Middle Kingdom, a town of considerable size. Excavations around the Karnak temple show that the Middle Kingdom town had a layout with a grid pattern. The city was roughly 250 hectares in area. Remains of two palatial buildings were also detected.

Starting in the later part of the 12th Dynasty, a group of Canaanite people began settling in the eastern Nile Delta. They eventually founded the 14th Dynasty at Avaris in c. 1805 BC or c. 1710 BC. By doing so, the Asiatics established hegemony over the majority of the Delta region, subtracting these territories from the influence of the 13th Dynasty that had meanwhile succeeded the 12th.

=== Second Intermediate Period ===
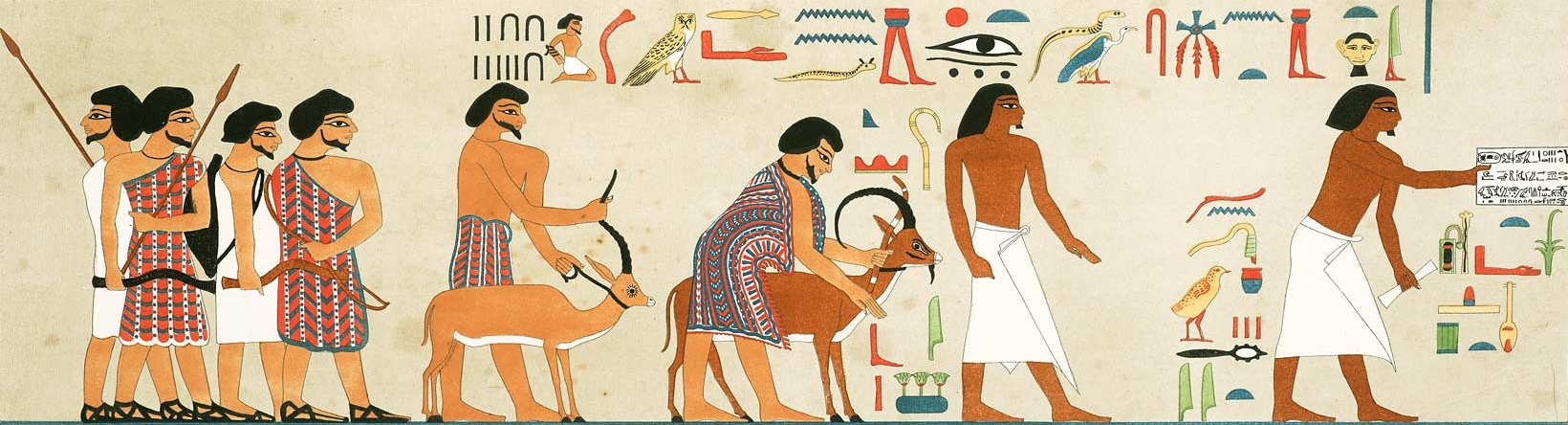
Depiction of Asiatic (left) and Egyptian people (right). The Asiatic leader is labeled as "Ruler of foreign lands", Ibsha.

A second wave of Asiatics called Hyksos (from Heqa-khasut, "rulers of foreign lands" as Egyptians called their leaders) immigrated into Egypt and overran the Canaanite center of power at Avaris, starting the 15th Dynasty there. The Hyksos kings gained the upper hand over Lower Egypt early into the Second Intermediate Period (1657–1549 BC). When the Hyksos took Memphis during or shortly after Merneferre Ay's reign (c. 1700 BC), the rulers of the 13th Dynasty fled south to Thebes, which was restored as capital.

Theban princes (now known as the 16th Dynasty) stood firmly over their immediate region as the Hyksos advanced from the Delta southwards to Middle Egypt. The Thebans resisted the Hyksos' further advance by making an agreement for a peaceful concurrent rule between them. The Hyksos were able to sail upstream past Thebes to trade with the Nubians and the Thebans brought their herds to the Delta without adversaries. The status quo continued until Hyksos ruler Apophis (15th Dynasty) insulted Seqenenre Tao (17th Dynasty) of Thebes. Soon the armies of Thebes marched on the Hyksos-ruled lands. Tao died in battle and his son Kamose took charge of the campaign. After Kamose's death, his brother Ahmose I continued until he captured Avaris, the Hyksos capital. Ahmose I drove the Hyksos out of Egypt and the Levant and reclaimed the lands formerly ruled by them.

=== New Kingdom and the height of Thebes ===
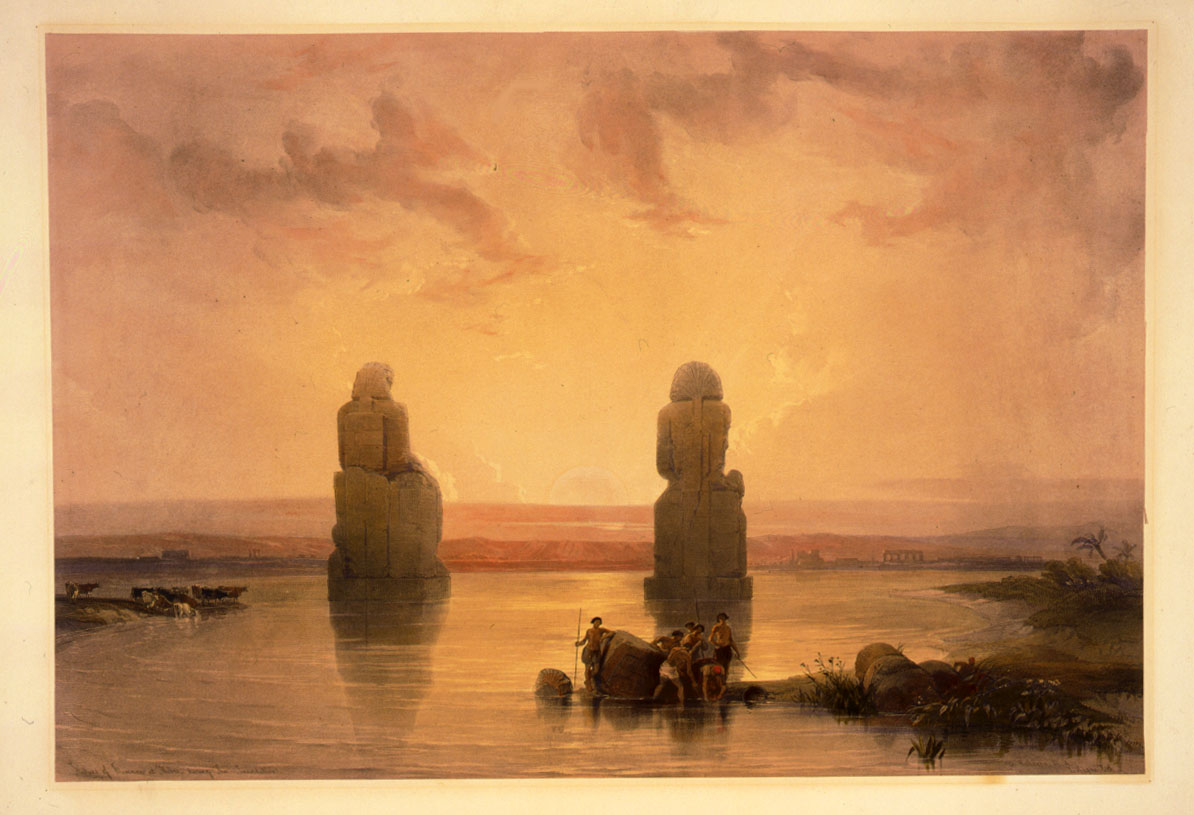
Statues of Memnon at Thebes during the flood, after David Roberts, c. 1845

Ahmose I founded a new age for a unified Egypt with Thebes as its capital. The city remained as capital during most of the 18th Dynasty (New Kingdom). It also became the center for a newly established professional civil service, where there was a greater demand for scribes and the literate as the royal archives began to fill with accounts and reports. At the city the favored few of Nubia were reeducated with Egyptian culture, to serve as administrators of the colony.

Overhead illustration of the Karnak temple

With Egypt stabilized again, religion and religious centers flourished and none more so than Thebes. For instance, Amenhotep III poured much of his vast wealth from foreign tribute into the temples of Amun. The Theban god Amun became a principal state deity and every building project sought to outdo the last in proclaiming the glory of Amun and the pharaohs themselves. Thutmose I (reigned 1506–1493 BC) began the first great expansion of the Karnak temple. After this, colossal enlargements of the temple became the norm throughout the New Kingdom.

Queen Hatshepsut (reigned 1479–1458 BC) helped the Theban economy flourish by renewing trade networks, primarily the Red Sea trade between Thebes's Red Sea port of Al-Qusayr, Elat and the land of Punt. Her successor Thutmose III brought to Thebes a great deal of his war booty that originated from as far away as Mittani. The 18th Dynasty reached its peak during his great-grandson Amenhotep III's reign (1388–1350 BC). Aside from embellishing the temples of Amun, Amenhotep increased construction in Thebes to unprecedented levels. On the west bank, he built the enormous mortuary temple and the equally massive Malkata palace-city, which fronted a 364-hectare artificial lake. In the city proper he built the Luxor temple and the Avenue of the Sphinxes leading to Karnak.

For a brief period in the reign of Amenhotep III's son Akhenaten (1351–1334 BC), Thebes fell on hard times; the city was abandoned by the court, and the worship of Amun was proscribed. The capital was moved to the new city of Akhetaten (Amarna in modern Egypt), midway between Thebes and Memphis. After his death, his son Tutankhamun returned the capital to Memphis, but renewed building projects at Thebes produced even more glorious temples and shrines.

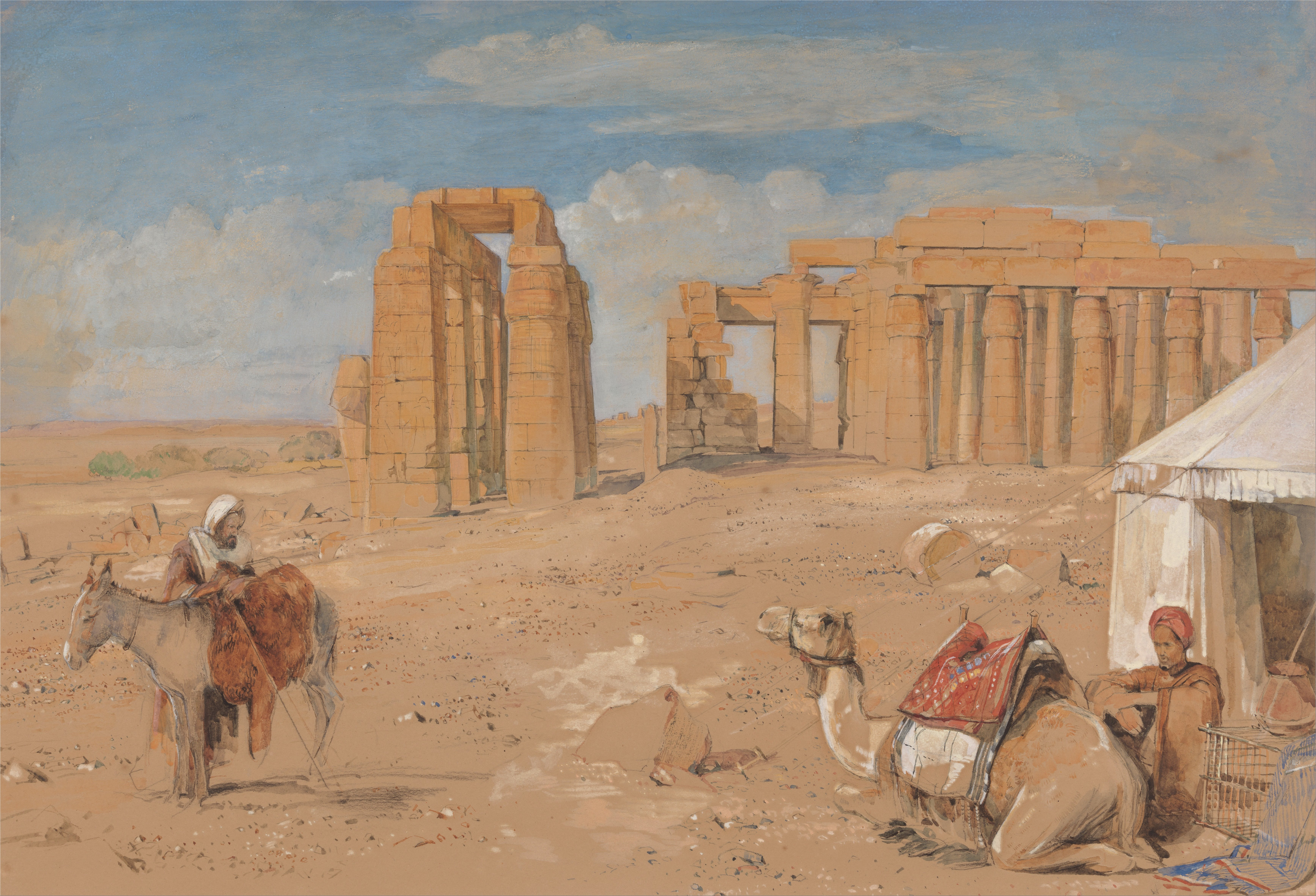
The Ramesseum at Thebes, by John Frederick Lewis, c. 1845 (Yale Center for British Art, New Haven)

With the 19th Dynasty the seat of government moved to the Delta. Thebes maintained its revenues and prestige through the reigns of Seti I (1290–1279 BC) and Ramesses II (1279–1213 BC), who still resided for part of every year in Thebes. Ramesses II carried out extensive building projects in the city, such as statues and obelisks, the third enclosure wall of Karnak temple, additions to the Luxor temple, and the Ramesseum, his grand mortuary temple. The constructions were bankrolled by the large granaries (built around the Ramesseum) that concentrated the taxes collected from Upper Egypt; and by the gold from expeditions to Nubia and the Eastern Desert. During Ramesses's long 66-year reign, Egypt and Thebes reached an overwhelming state of prosperity that equaled or even surpassed the earlier peak under Amenhotep III.

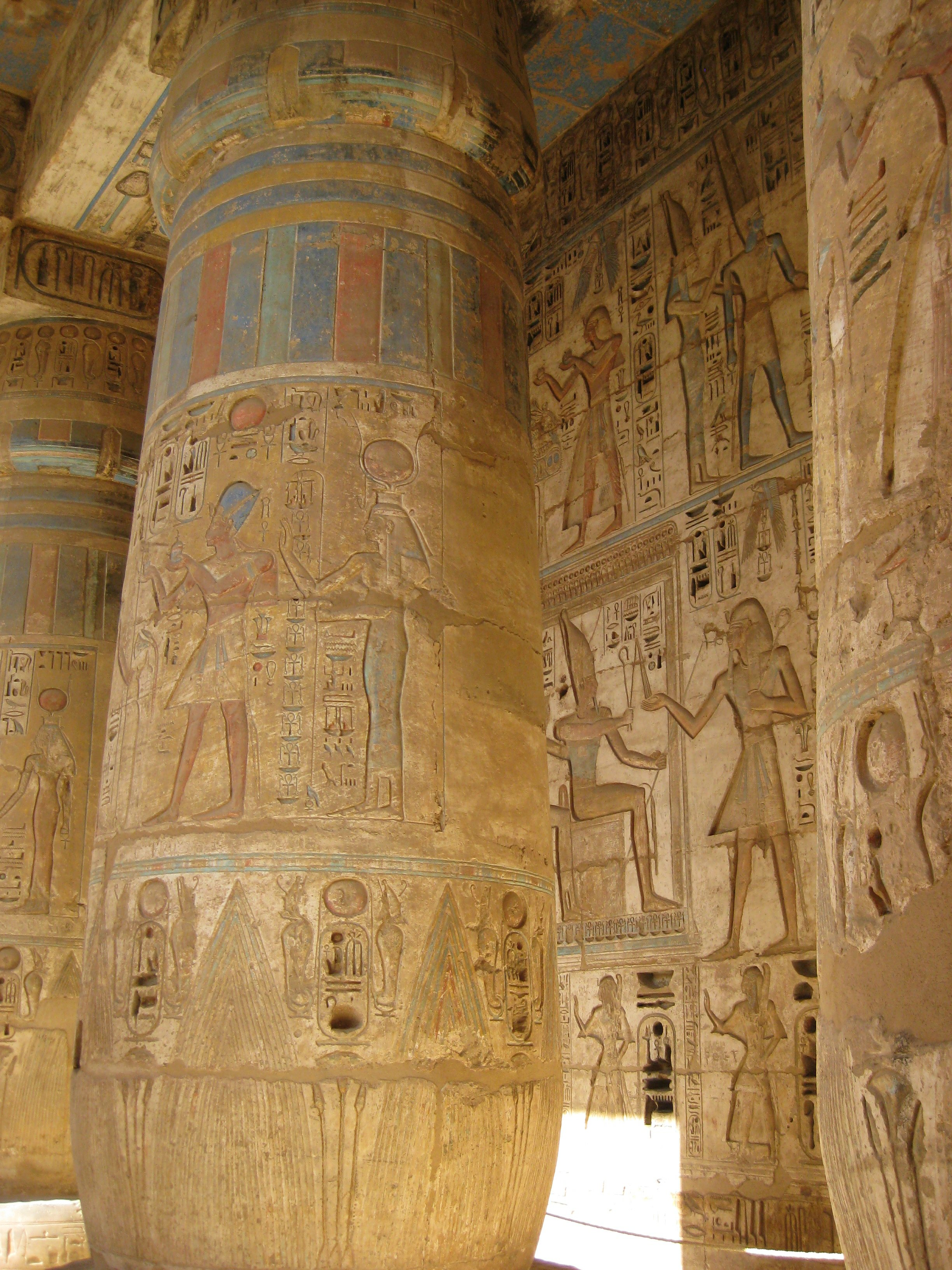
Polychromed column with bas-reliefs at the temple of Medinet Habu, dedicated to Rameses III

The city continued to be well kept in the early 20th Dynasty. The Great Harris Papyrus states that Ramesses III (reigned 1187–1156 BC) donated 86,486 slaves and vast estates to the temples of Amun. Ramesses III received tributes from all subject peoples including the Sea Peoples and Meshwesh Libyans. The whole of Egypt was experiencing financial problems, however, exemplified in the events at Thebes's village of Deir el-Medina. In the 25th year of his reign, workers in Deir el-Medina began striking for pay and there arose a general unrest of all social classes. Subsequently, an unsuccessful Harem conspiracy led to the executions of many conspirators, including Theban officials and women.

Under the later Ramessids, Thebes began to decline as the government fell into grave economic difficulties. During the reign of Ramesses IX (1129–1111 BC), about 1114 BC, a series of investigations into the plundering of royal tombs in the necropolis of western Thebes uncovered proof of corruption in high places, following an accusation made by the mayor of the east bank against his colleague on the west. The plundered royal mummies were moved from place to place and at last deposited by the priests of Amun in a tomb-shaft in Deir el-Bahri and in the tomb of Amenhotep II. (The finding of these two hiding places in 1881 and 1898, respectively, was one of the great events of modern archaeological discovery.) Such maladministration in Thebes led to unrest.

=== Third Intermediate Period ===
Control of local affairs tended to come more and more into the hands of the High Priests of Amun, so that during the Third Intermediate Period, the High Priest of Amun exerted absolute power over the South, a counterbalance to the 21st and 22nd Dynasty kings who ruled from the Delta. Intermarriage and adoption strengthened the ties between them, daughters of the Tanite kings being installed as God's Wife of Amun at Thebes, where they wielded greater power. Theban political influence receded only in the Late Period.

By around 750 BC, the Kushites (Nubians) were growing their influence over Thebes and Upper Egypt. In 721 BC, King Shabaka of the Kushites defeated the combined forces of Osorkon IV (22nd Dynasty), Peftjauawybast (23rd Dynasty) Bakenranef (24th Dynasty) and reunified Egypt yet again. His reign saw a significant amount of building work undertaken throughout Egypt, especially at the city of Thebes, which he made the capital of his kingdom. In Karnak he erected a pink granite statue of himself wearing the Pschent (the double crown of Egypt). Taharqa accomplished many notable projects at Thebes (i.e. the Kiosk in Karnak) and Nubia before the Assyrians started to wage war against Egypt.

=== Late Period ===
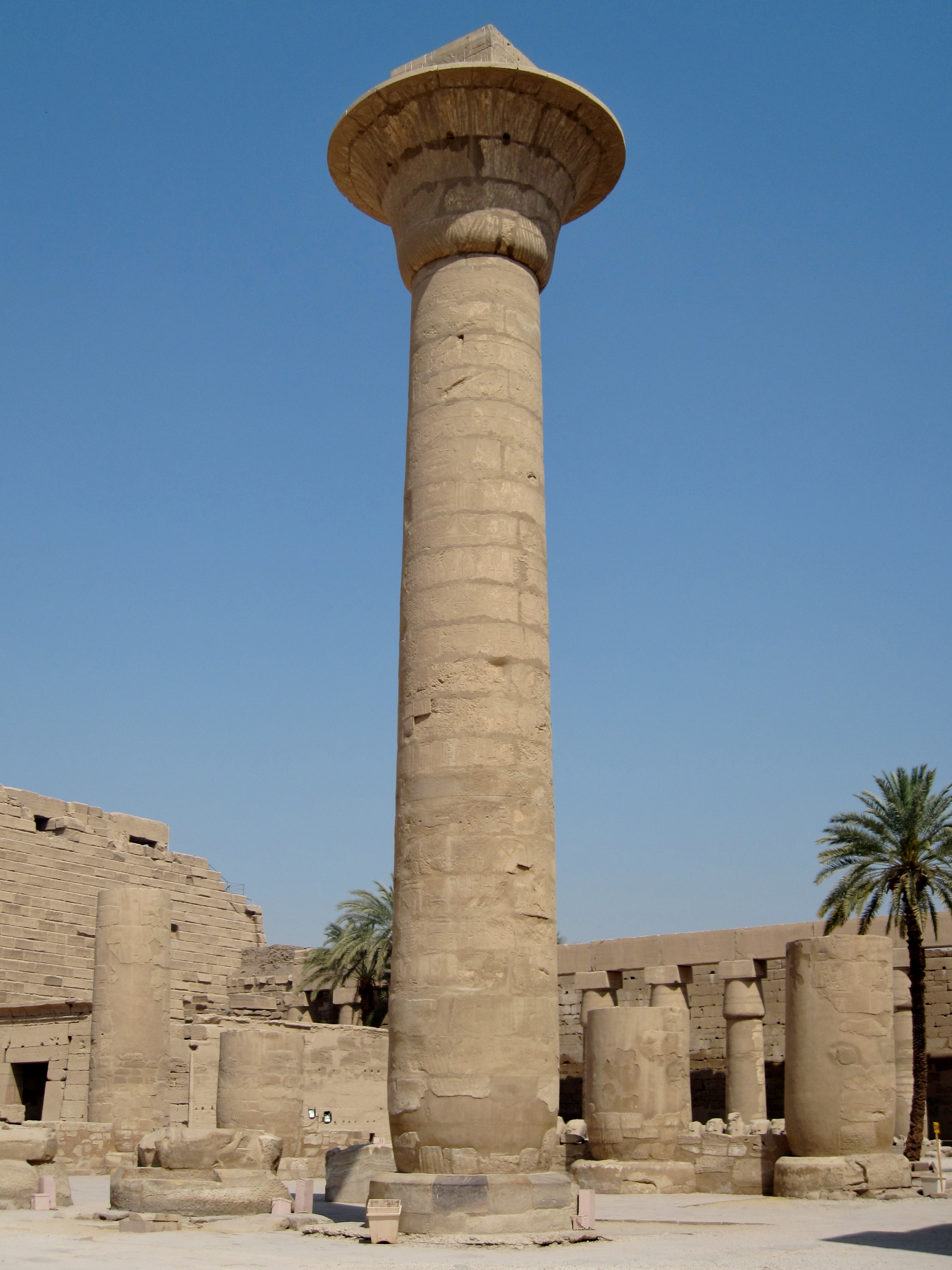
A column of Taharqa at the precinct of Amun-Re at Karnak Temple restored to full height

In 667 BC, attacked by the Assyrian king Ashurbanipal's army, Taharqa abandoned Lower Egypt and fled to Thebes. After his death three years later his nephew (or cousin) Tantamani seized Thebes, invaded Lower Egypt and laid siege to Memphis, but abandoned his attempts to conquer the country in 663 BC and retreated southwards. The Assyrians pursued him and took Thebes, whose name was added to a long list of cities plundered and destroyed by the Assyrians, as Ashurbanipal wrote:

This city, the whole of it, I conquered it with the help of Ashur and Ishtar. Silver, gold, precious stones, all the wealth of the palace, rich cloth, precious linen, great horses, supervising men and women, two obelisks of splendid electrum, weighing 2,500 talents, the doors of temples I tore from their bases and carried them off to Assyria. With this weighty booty I left Thebes. Against Egypt and Kush I have lifted my spear and shown my power. With full hands I have returned to Nineveh, in good health.

Thebes never regained its former political significance, but it remained an important religious centre. Assyrians installed Psamtik I (664–610 BC), who ascended to Thebes in 656 BC and brought about the adoption of his own daughter, Nitocris I, as heiress to God's Wife of Amun there. In 525 BC, Persian Cambyses II invaded Egypt and became pharaoh, subordinating the kingdom as a satrapy to the greater Achaemenid Empire.

=== Graeco-Roman Period ===
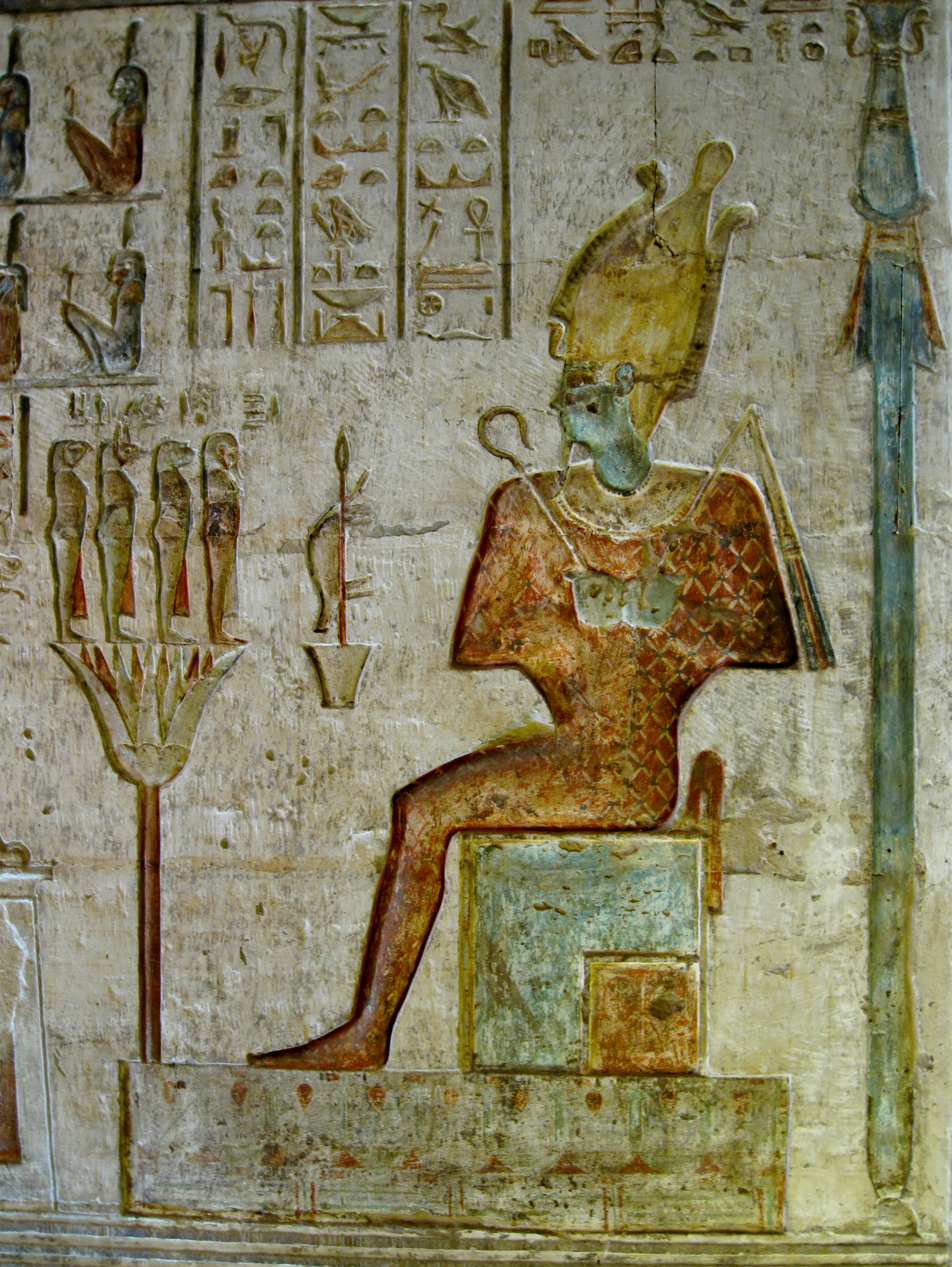
Relief in Hathor temple, Deir el-Medina (built during the Ptolemaic Dynasty)

The good relationship of the Thebans with the central power in the North ended when the native Egyptian pharaohs were finally replaced by Greeks, led by Alexander the Great. He visited Thebes during a celebration of the Opet Festival. In spite of his welcoming visit, Thebes became a center for dissent. Towards the end of the third century BC, Hugronaphor (Horwennefer), possibly of Nubian origin, led a revolt against the Ptolemies in Upper Egypt. His successor, Ankhmakis, held large parts of Upper Egypt until 185 BC. This revolt was supported by the Theban priesthood. After the suppression of the revolt in 185 BC, Ptolemy V, in need of the support of the priesthood, pardoned them.

Half a century later the Thebans rose again, elevating a certain Harsiesi to the throne in 132 BC. Harsiesi, having helped himself to the funds of the royal bank at Thebes, fled the following year. In 91 BC, another revolt broke out. In the following years, Thebes was subdued, and the city turned into rubble.

During the Roman occupation (30 BC–641 AD), the remaining communities clustered around the pylon of the Luxor temple. Thebes became part of the Roman province of Thebais, which was later split into Thebais Superior, centered at the city, and Thebais Inferior, centered at Ptolemais Hermiou. A Roman legion was headquartered in Luxor temple at the time of Roman campaigns in Nubia. Building did not come to an abrupt stop, but the city continued to decline. In the first century AD, Strabo described Thebes as having been relegated to a mere village.

== Major sites ==
Eastern Thebes:

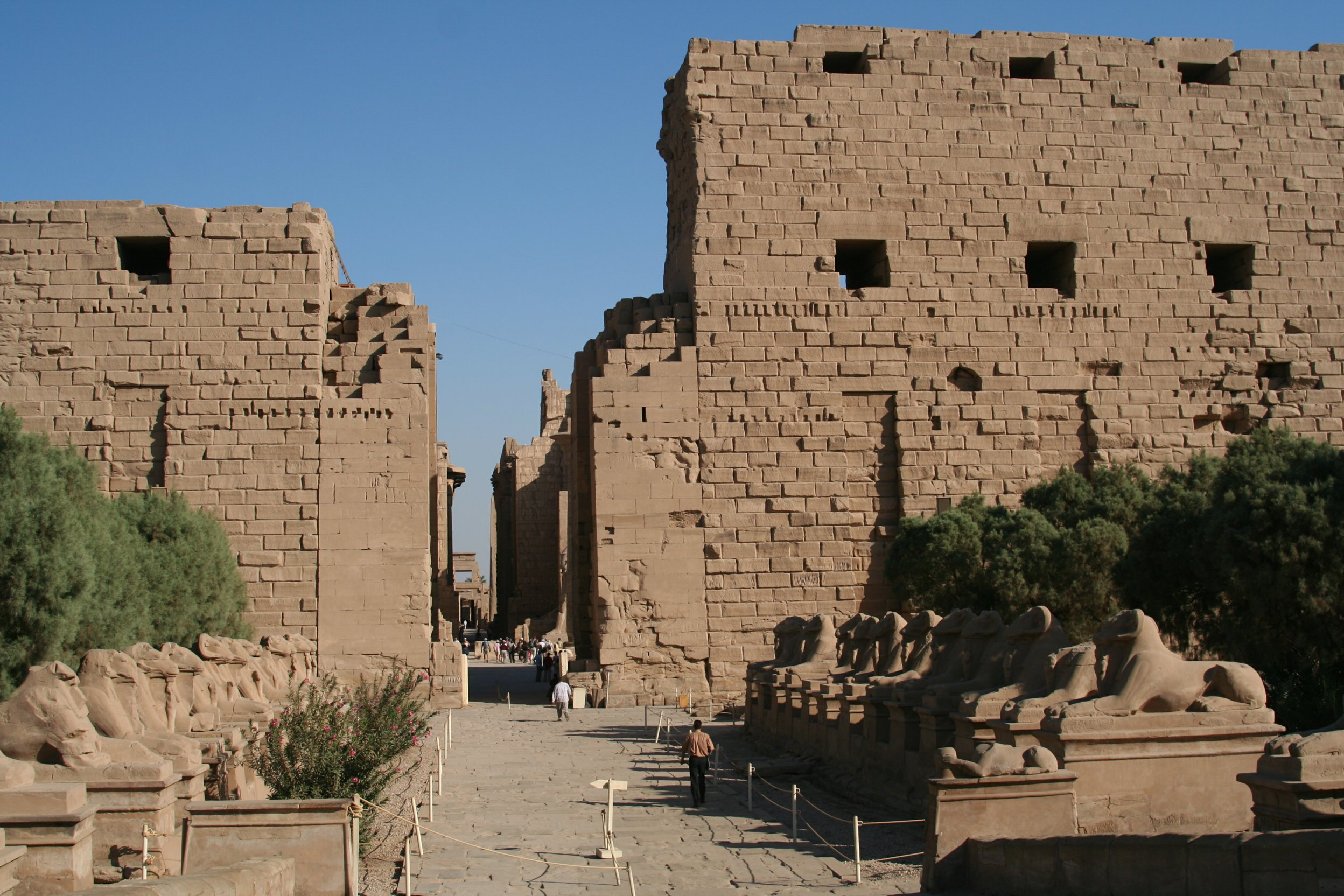
The main entrance to Karnak flanked by ram-headed sphinxes

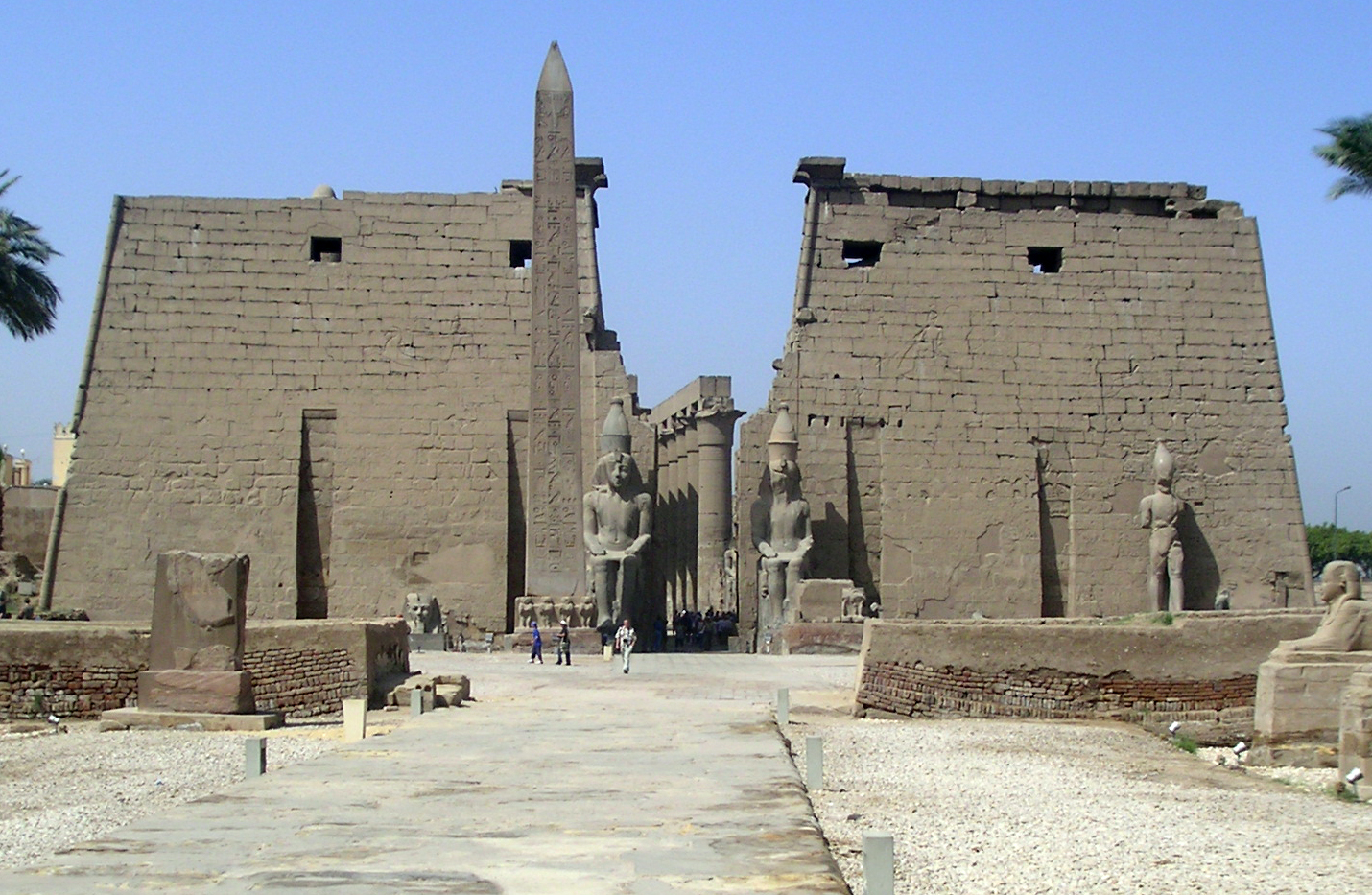
Obelisk, Ramesside colossi and great pylon of Luxor Temple with subtle orange glow

- Ancient built-up area
- Great Temple of Amun at Karnak (Ancient Egyptian Ta-opet). Still the second largest religious building ever built, it is the main house of worship for Amun, Thebes's patron deity, and the residence of the powerful Amun priesthood. What differentiated it from the many temples of Egypt is the length of time it was built over (more than 2,000 years, starting in the Middle Kingdom). The main features of this temple are its ten large pylons, the Great Hypostyle Hall, a sacred lake, sub-temples, numerous shrines and multiple obelisks. It was the most important temple for a majority of Ancient Egyptian history.
- Luxor Temple (Ipet resyt). Unlike the other temples in Thebes, it is not dedicated to a cult god or a deified version of the king in death. Instead, it is dedicated to the rejuvenation of kingship; it may have been where many of the pharaohs of Egypt were crowned. It is a centerpiece of the "Opet Festival", where the sacred barque of the Theban Triad travels from Karnak to Luxor temple highlighting the godly significance of the pharaoh's re-coronation .
- Temple of Khonsu
- Precinct of Mut
- Precinct of Montu
- Avenue of Sphinxes

Western Thebes:

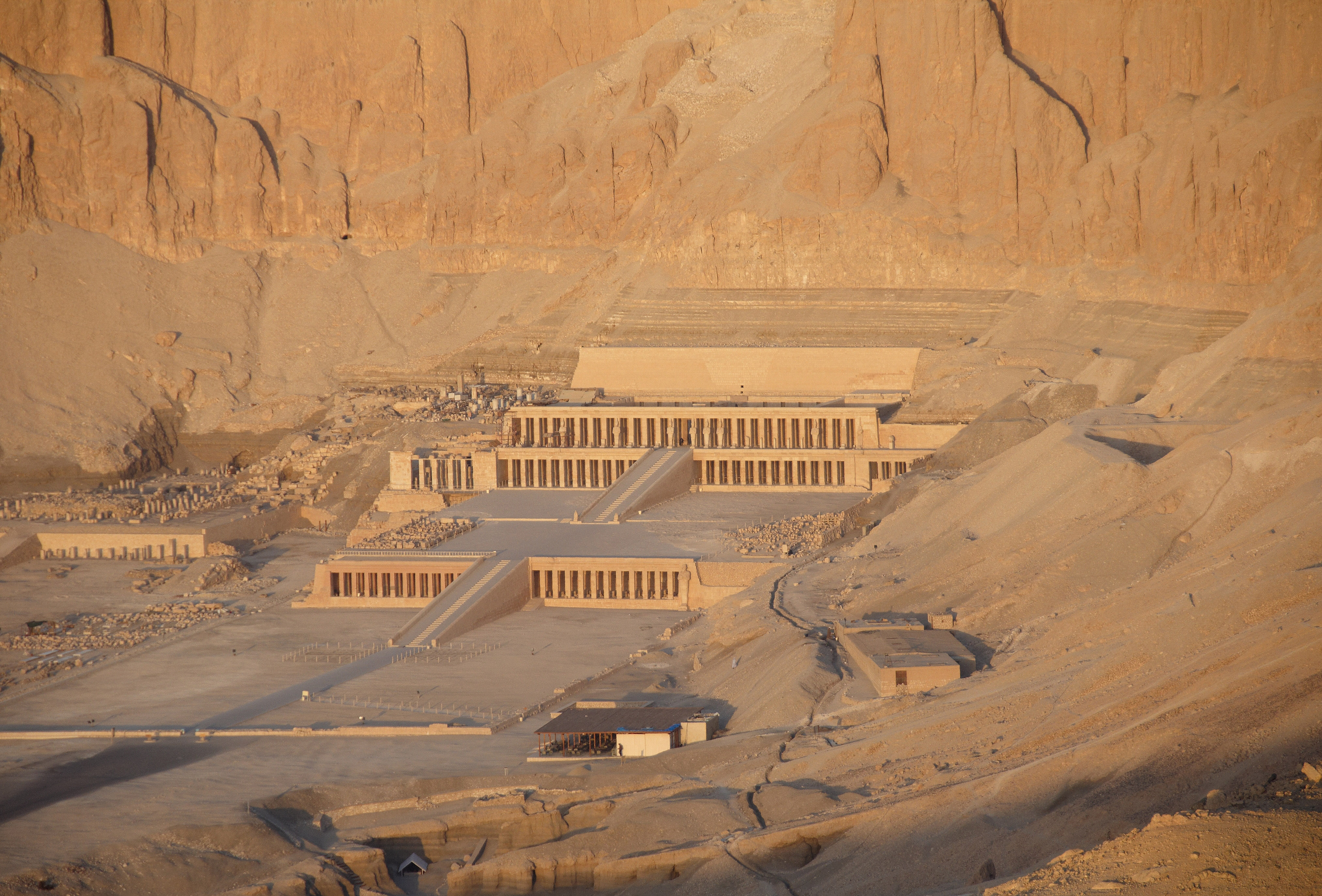
Sunshine illuminates Hatshepsut's mortuary temple in Deir al-Bahri

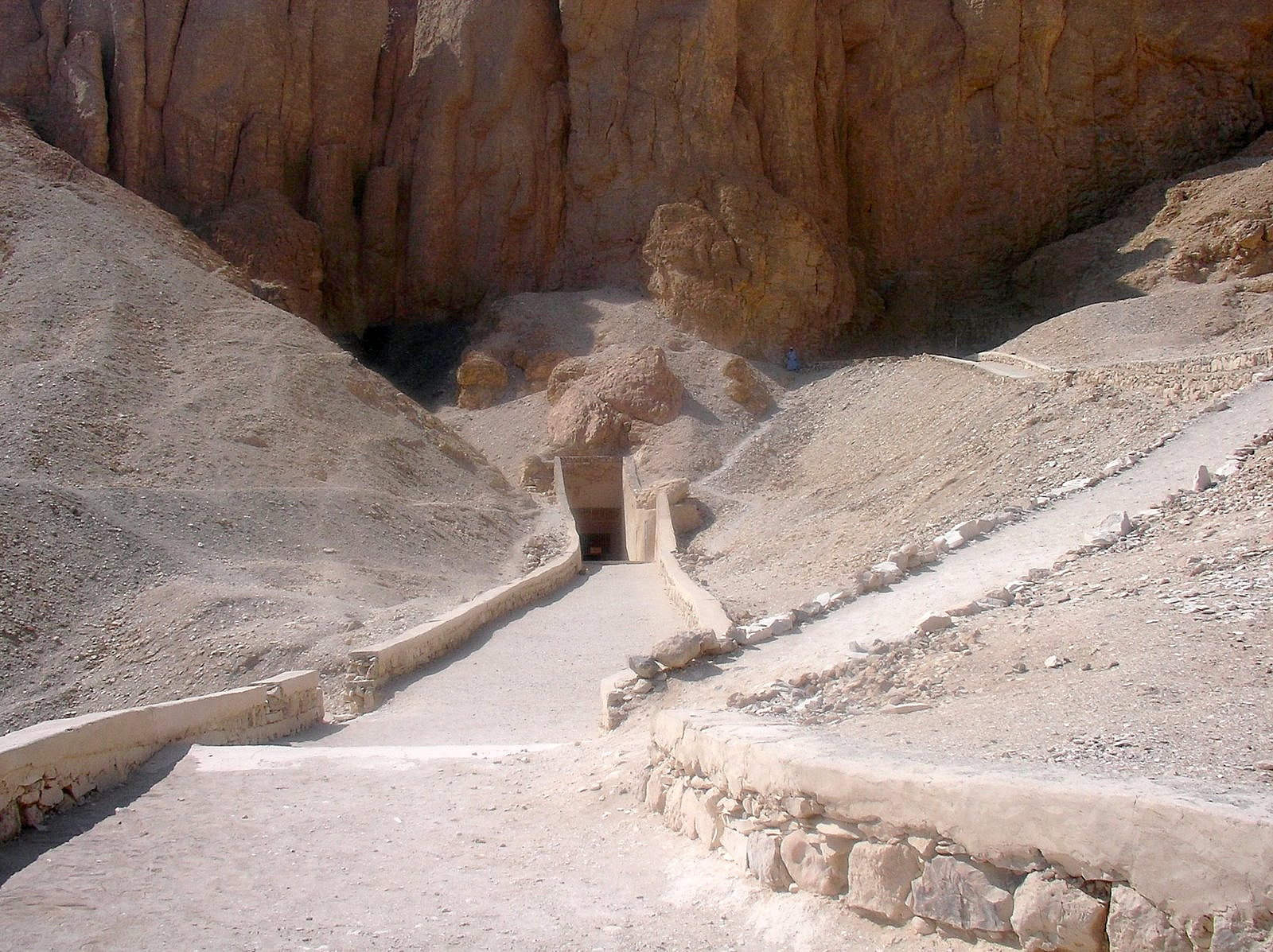
The entrance to KV19, tomb of Mentuherkhepeshef in the Valley of the Kings

- Village of Deir el-Medina
- Malkata palace complex
- Ramesseum
- Mortuary Temple of Amenhotep III
- Mortuary Temple of Hatshepsut
- Mortuary Temple of Seti I
- Mortuary Temple of Ramesses III
- Valley of the Kings
- Valley of the Queens
- Tombs of the Nobles
- The Rise of Aten

== Cultural heritage ==
Thebes was home to several major monuments of ancient Egypt including the temples of Luxor and Karnak, along with the Valley of the Kings and the Valley of the Queens.

From 25 October 2018 to 27 January 2019, the Museum of Grenoble organized with the support of the Louvre and the British Museum, a three-month exhibition on the city of Thebes and the role of women in the city at that time.

== In popular culture ==
In the novel The Egyptian (1945) by Mika Waltari, there are elaborate descriptions of how Thebes looked during the 18th Dynasty of Ancient Egypt.

Thebes is a setting in the films The Mummy (1999) and The Mummy Returns (2001). It is said to be the "Land of the Living". (In real history, there was no such name given to it.) The films feature scenes taking place in ancient Egypt in its prime, which affect the story in the modern setting some 3000 years later.

== See also ==
- New Thebes
- List of ancient Egyptian towns and cities
- Thebes, Greece – the namesake
- List of historical capitals of Egypt
- List of cities and towns in Egypt

== Notes ==
Preceded by Herakleopolis	Capital of Egypt; 2060 BC – c. 1980 BC	Succeeded by Itjtawy
Preceded by Itjtawy	Capital of Upper Egypt c. 1700 BC – c. 1550 BC	Succeeded by Thebes as capital of united Egypt
Preceded by Thebes	Capital of Egypt c. 1550 BC – c. 1353 BC	Succeeded by Akhetaten
Preceded by Akhetaten	Capital of Egypt c. 1332 BC – 1085 BC	Succeeded by Pi-Ramesses
