= 600s BC (decade) =

Decade

This article concerns the period 609 BC – 600 BC.

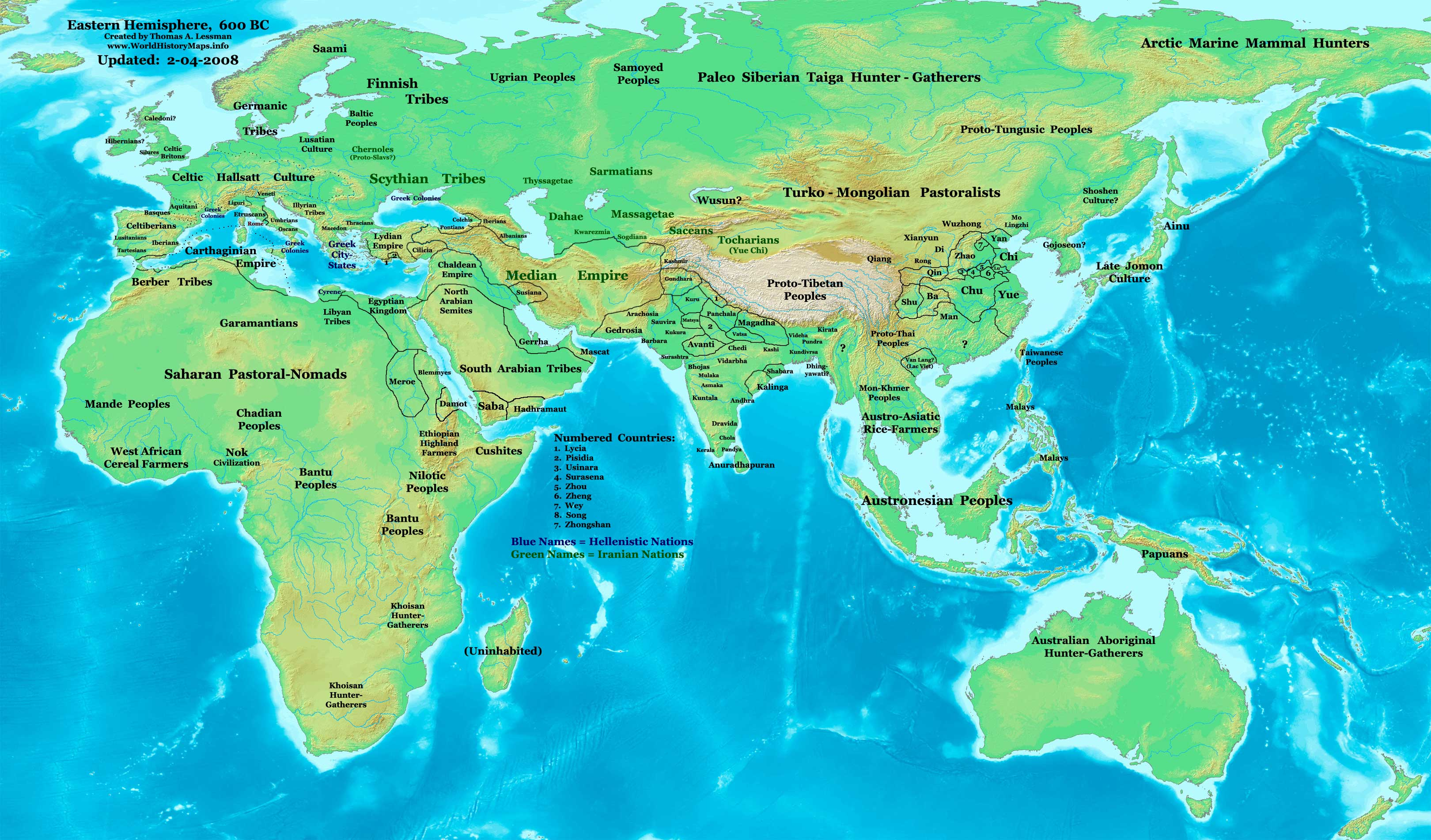
Map of the Eastern Hemisphere in 600 BC.

== Events and trends ==
- 609 BC—The Babylonians defeat the Assyrian army of Ashur-uballit II and capture Harran. Ashur-uballit, the last Assyrian king, disappears from history.
- 609 BC—Battle of Megiddo: King Josiah of Judah dies in battle against Pharaoh Necho II of Egypt, who is on his way north to aid the Assyrian state of Ashur-uballit II. Jehoahaz succeeds his father Josiah as King of Judah, but is quickly deposed by Necho, who installs Jehoahaz's brother Jehoiakim in his place.
- c. 609 BC—The Persian Gulf recedes by a large portion, extending the Tigris and Euphrates rivers by 187 mi (300 km).
- 607 BC (15–26 March)—Halley's Comet is visible from Earth.
- 606 BC—Ji Yu succeeds Zhou Kuang Wang as king of the Zhou dynasty in China.
- 605 BC—Battle of Carchemish: Crown Prince Nebuchadnezzar II of Babylon defeats the army of Necho II of Egypt, securing the Babylonian conquest of Assyria. The Babylonians pursue through Syria and Palestine.
- 605 BC—Battle of Hamath: Nebuchadnezzar II defeats the remainder of the Egyptian army following the Battle of Carchemish.
- 605 BC—Nebuchadnezzar II succeeds his father Nabopolassar as King of Babylon.
- 603 BC—In the second year of his reign, Nebuchadnezzar II proclaimed the intercalary month Ululu II.
- 601 BC—Foundation of Perinthus by settlers from Samos (traditional date).
- 601 BC—The Jewish–Babylonian war begins between the Kingdom of Judah and Babylonia.
- 600 BC—Marseille is founded by Greeks of Phocaea, who are victorious over the Carthaginians in a naval battle, beginning the Greco–Punic Wars.
- 600 BC—The Satrapy of Armenia is created.
- 600 BC—Capua is founded.
- 600 BC—Smyrna is sacked and destroyed by Alyattes of Lydia.
- 600 BC—Nebuchadnezzar II builds the Hanging Gardens of Babylon.
- c. 600 BC—Milan is founded by Celts.
- c. 600 BC—Pompeii is founded.
- c. 600 BC—The Etruscans capture the settlement of Rome, making it into a prosperous trading centre.
- c. 600 BC—Zarathustra's religion becomes popular in Persia.
- c. 600 BC—Radiocarbon dating for first circular inhabitation enclosure at Emain Macha.
- c. 600 BC—580 BC—Construction begins on the Temple of Artemis, Korkyra (Corfu).
- c. 600 BC—Construction begins on the largest mound at Cahokia. Construction continues until AD 200.
- c. 600 BC—The Archaic period of sculpture begins in Ancient Greece.
- c. 600 BC—Pitcher (container) (olpe), from Corinth, is made.
- c. 600 BC—Kouros sculptures begin to be made.
- c. 600 BC—The Doric and Ionic orders are well developed.
- c. 600 BC–500 BC—A calendrical system appears in areas with strong Olmec influence in Mesoamerica.

== Significant people ==
- 609 BC—Death of Josiah, king of Judah
- 609 BC—Duke Kang of Qin, ruler of the state of Qin
- 609 BC—Duke Yi of Qi, ruler of the state of Qi
- 608 BC—Birth of Peisistratus, ruler of Athens
- c. 607 BC—Birth of Sudharmaswami, fifth ganadhara of Mahavira (died 506 BC)
- 607 BC—Death of King Kuang of the Zhou dynasty of China
- 607 BC—Death of Duke Ling of Jin, ruler of the Chinese state of Jin
- 605 BC—Death of Nabopolassar, first ruler of the Neo-Babylonian Empire
- 604 BC—Death of Duke Gong of Qin, ruler of the Chinese state of Qin
- 601 BC—Death of Viscount Xuan of Zhao
- c. 600 BC—Birth of King Cambyses I of Anshan, head of the Achaemenid dynasty
- c. 600 BC—Birth of Cyrus the Great, king of Persia (or 576 BC)
- 600 BC—Birth of King Gong of Chu, king of the Chinese state of Chu
- 600 BC—Death of Battus I of Cyrene, founder and first king of the Greek colony of Cyrenaica
- 600 BC—Death of Duke Cheng of Jin, ruler of the Chinese state of Jin
- c. 600 BC—Death of Cyrus I, king of Anshan, according to some sources
