= Battle of Carchemish =

Ancient battle in the region of Syria

Coordinates: 36.8297°N 38.0150°E

- Part of the Egyptian–Babylonian wars
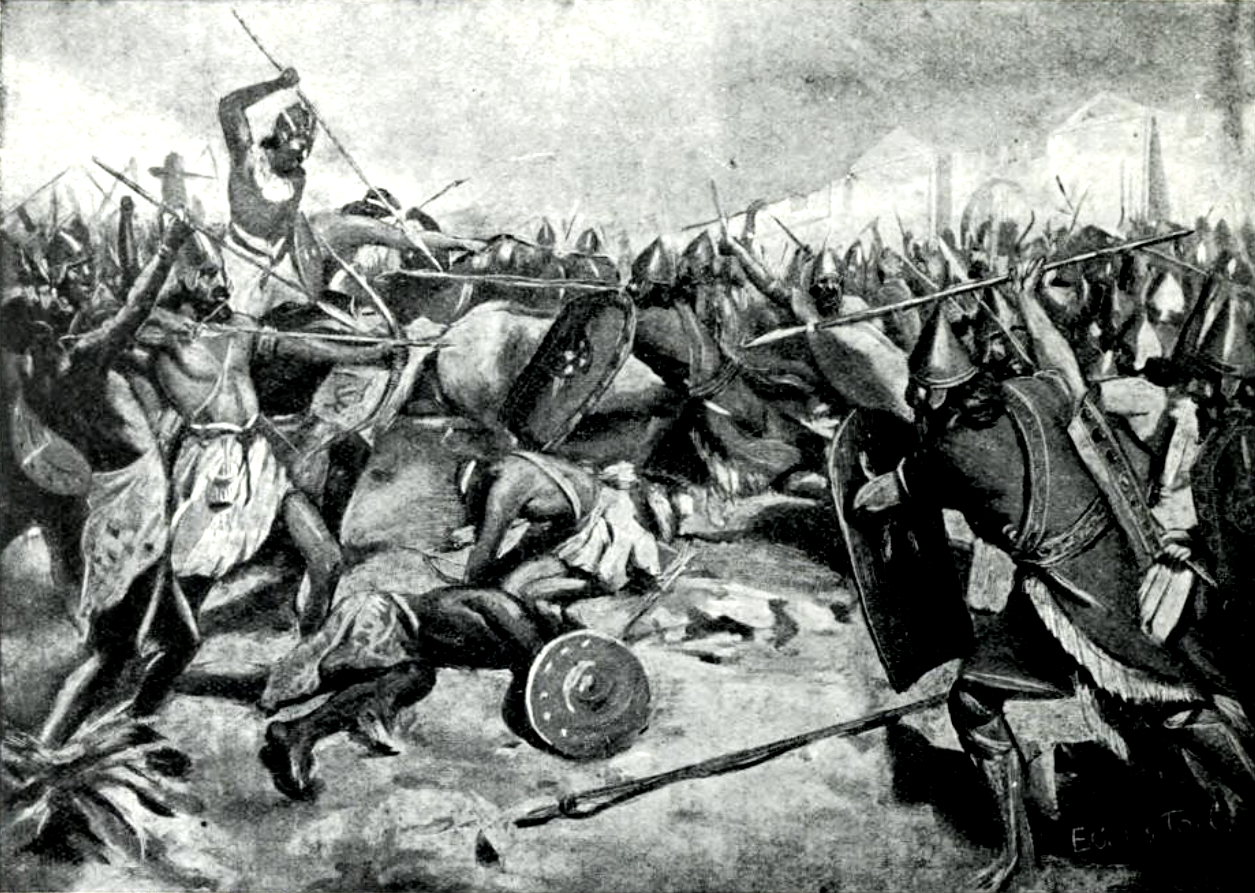
- The Battle of Carchemish, as depicted in Hutchinson's Story of the Nations (1900)
Date	c. 605 BCE
Location	Carchemish
Result	Babylonian victory
Territorial changes	End of the Egyptian intervention in the Near East

Belligerents
Twenty-sixth Dynasty of Egypt; Remnants of the army of the former Neo-Assyrian Empire	Neo-Babylonian Empire

Commanders and leaders
Necho II	Nebuchadnezzar II

Casualties and losses
Heavy	Minimal

The Battle of Carchemish was a battle fought around 605 BCE between the armies of Egypt, allied with the remnants of the Neo-Assyrian Empire, against the armies of Babylonia. The forces would clash at Carchemish, an important military crossing and trade city on the banks of the Euphrates River in modern-day Syria. Nebuchadnezzar II was given command of this Babylonian force while Nabopolassar, his father and the king of Babylonia, was still in Babylon. Necho II, the king of Egypt, led the Egyptian and Assyrian forces in the battle. The battle would end in a major defeat for the Egyptian and Assyrian forces. The defeat ended Egyptian influence in the Levant and led to Babylon expanding its domain to the borders of Egypt.

== Background ==
Egypt under the 26th dynasty had begun to re-establish their influence in the Levant with multiple vassal states, extending their Influence into the region. The Egyptian sphere of influence would come to dominate much of the Levant which the Neo-Assyrian Empire had once controlled, eventually making the declining Assyrian remnants an ally dependent on Egyptian support. Babylon and their allies, the Medes, fought against the Neo-Assyrian Empire to gain control over Syria, bringing them into conflict with Egypt as well.

When the Assyrian capital, Nineveh, was lost at the Battle of Ninevah to Babylon and the Medes in 612 BCE, the Assyrians moved their capital to Harran. Harran was captured in 609 BCE, forcing the Assyrians to flee to Carchemish where Ashur-Uballit II sought Necho II's aid in the war against Babylon. Necho II had become the king of Egypt around 610/609 BCE after the death of his father, Psamtik I. Necho II would honor this call and marched with an army to aid the Assyrians in a siege to retake Haran.

While marching north, Necho II would face a hostile force at the site of Megiddo led by Josiah, the king of Judah, who was allied to the Babylonians. Josiah and the Judeans aimed to delay the Egyptians enough to ensure the defeat of the Assyrians whom they were vassal to centuries earlier. The Judean army was defeated at the Battle of Megiddo and Josiah would be killed in 609 BCE. Necho II used the death of Josiah to install a new king to the Judean throne, Jehoiakim, who would serve as an Egyptian ally and vassal.

After fighting the Judeans, Necho II resumed his march north to aid the Assyrians in retaking their lost capital of Harran. The Siege of Harran ended in failure as an attack on the Babylonian and Median forces led to the defeat of the Assyrians and the Egyptian force. Ashur-Uballit II's fate is unknown as he is never mentioned again in any surviving source. Necho II survived the failed siege and returned with his army to Egypt.

== Battle ==
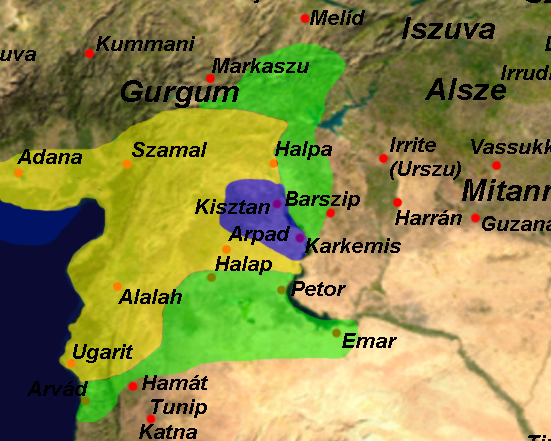
Map of the Syrian region, Carchemish is labeled as Karkemis.

Around 605 BCE, Carchemish, the capital for the remnants of the Neo-Assyrian Empire, came under threat by the Babylonian and Medians. Aside from being the Assyrian capital, Carchemish was also an important location as it was a major trading city and crossing point for the Euphrates River. Nebuchadnezzar II was made commander of the allied Babylonian and Median force. Necho II would bring an army north to defend the city and their allies against further Babylonian expansion. The armies of Necho II and Nebuchadnezzar II met at or near Carchemish in 605 BCE. The battle ended in the defeat of the Egyptian and Assyrian forces to Babylon and its allies. There is no specific or exact number known for the forces each side commanded, nor how the battle progressed. Nebuchadnezzar II conquered Carchemish and expanded Babylon through the defeated remnants of the Assyrian state. The defeat would end all Egyptian influence in the Levant.

== Historical records ==
There are no surviving Egyptian records of the battle, either in text or artworks. All historical records of the conflict come from Babylonian and Jewish sources.

The Nebuchadnezzar Chronicle, one of the surviving Babylonian sources, claims that Nebuchadnezzar II, "crossed the river to go against the Egyptian army which lay in Karchemiš. They fought with each other and the Egyptian army withdrew before him. He accomplished their defeat, decisively. As for the rest of the Egyptian army which had escaped from the defeat so quickly that no weapon had reached them, in the district of Hamath, the Babylonian troops overtook and defeated them so that not a single man escaped to his own country. At that time, Nebuchadnezzar conquered the whole area of Hamath." This source paints the battle as exceedingly decisive without any Egyptians surviving the conflict, however the validity of this claim is questionable. It is not likely that the entire Egyptian army under Necho II was defeated in its entirety at the battle of Carchemish.

The battle is also mentioned and described in the Bible, in the Book of Jeremiah. It records that Necho II was defeated by Nebuchadnezzar II at Charchemish on the banks of the Euphrates River. This source however has some inconsistencies, such as labeling Nebuchadnezzar II as the king of Babylon despite his father, Nabopolassar still being king. Other sections of the bible, such as the Books of Kings, almost make mention of the aftermath of Carchemish and the conquest of Jerusalem to Babylonian forces. There are also discrepancies with the dates across these sections such as with the Book of Jeremiah not counting the accession year while the Books of Kings does, which causes the conquest of Jerusalem in these to either fall in Nebuchadnezzar II's seventh or eighth year as king.

Historians agree Necho II fought in support of the remaining Assyrian forces. The Jewish Historian Flavius Josephus, Antiquities of the Jews, wrote that Necho II entered the battle to take advantage of the power vacuum created by the Assyrian forces' defeat rather than assist them. Josephus was writing in the first century CE, about 700 years after the Battle of Carchemish, the validity of his claims about it is debatable.

The absence of any Egyptian record of the battle may come from Necho II's son, Psamtik II, who may have removed his father's name from historical records or monuments. However, there is reason to doubt if Psamtik II actually did so, some scholars, such as Roberto Gozzoli, express doubt that this actually happened, arguing that the evidence for this is fragmentary and rather contradictory. While his son may not have defaced Necho II's name, a later successor or later dynasty may have done so for an unknown reason. Another reason for the battle's absence could be the major defeat reflecting poorly on Necho II and wishing to not commemorate the loss of Egyptian influence in the Levant.

== See also ==
- Siege of Kimuhu
- Battle of Quramati
- Last stand

== Notes ==
=== Sources ===
Binns, Elliot L. "The Syrian Campaign of Necho II." The Journal of Theological Studies 18, no. 69 (1916): 36-47.

Freedman, David Noel. "The Babylonian Chronicle." The Biblical Archaeologist 19, no. 3 (1956): 49-60.

Gozzoli, Roberto B. "The Statue of BM EA 37891 and the Erasure of Necho II's names." The Journal of Egyptian Archaeology 86 (2000): 67-80.

Hoffman, Sara L. "The Battle of Carchemish and Seventh/Sixth-Century Regional Politics." Behind the Scenes of the Old Testament: Cultural, Social, Historical Context, edited by Jonathan S. Greer, John W. Hilber, and John H. Walton. Baker Academic, 2018.

Hyatt, Philip J. "New Light on Nebuchadrezzar and Judean History." Journal of Biblical Literature 75, no. 4 (1956): 277-284.

Malamat, A. "A New Record of Nebuchadrezzar's Palestinian Campaigns." Israel Exploration Journal 6, no. 4 (1956): 246-256.

Mieroop, Marc Van De. A History of Ancient Egypt. John Wiley and Sons, 2010.

Roger, Henry. "The Battle of Carchemish." Synchronized Chronology. Algora Publishing, 2002.

Rowton, M. B. "Jermiah and the Death of Josiah." Journal of Near Eastern Studies 10, no. 2 (1951): 128-130.

Ryholt, Kim. "New Light on the Legendary King Nechepsos of Egypt." The Journal of Egyptian Archaeology 97 (2011): 61-72.

Schipper, Bernd U. "Egypt and the Kingdom of Judah under Josiah and Jehoiakim." Tell Aviv 37 (2010): 200-226.

Seidl, Theodor. "Carchemish in Neat Eastern Historiography and in the Old Testament." OTE 22 (2009): 646-661.

Siegfried H. Horn. "The Babylonian Chronicle and the Ancient Calendar of the Kingdom of Judah." 12-27.
