= Battle of Migdol (601 BC) =

Ancient battle in the near east

- Part of the Egyptian–Babylonian wars
Date	c. 601 BC
Location	Migdol
Result	Egyptian Victory: Egypt captures Gaza

Belligerents
Egypt	Babylonia

Commanders and leaders
Necho II	Nebuchadnezzar II

Casualties and losses
Heavy	Heavy

The Battle of Migdol (601 BC) took place near the eastern border of Egypt between the Babylonians led by Nebuchadnezzar II and the Egyptians led by Necho II.

== Background ==
In the late years of the 7th century BC, the Neo-Babylonians had expanded into the Levant after driving the Egyptians out of the region. Yet, there was still Egyptian influence in the Southern Levant area close to Egypt. Therefore, a Babylonian campaign against Egypt itself was needed to end Egyptian intervention, strengthen Babylonian control in the Southern Levant, and invade Egypt itself.

== Battle ==
The battle took place in the last days of 601 BC. Nebuchadnezzar advanced into the Sinai to invade Egypt and was met by Necho and his forces. A fierce battle broke out near the fortress of Migdol where both sides had many casualties. The Babylonians withdrew and were pursued by Necho, who captured Gaza. Nebuchadnezzar stayed home the next year to rebuild his forces.
