= Battle of Hamath =

604 BCE battle

Coordinates: 35°8′N 36°45′E

- Part of the Egyptian-Babylonian wars
Date	c. 605 BC
Location	Hama
Result	Babylonian Victory

Belligerents
Egypt	Babylonia

Commanders and leaders
Necho II ?	Nebuchadrezzar II

Strength
Much fewer	Unknown

Casualties and losses
Very high	Low

The Battle of Hamath, sometimes called the Battle of Hama, took place between the Babylonians and the fleeing remnants of the Egyptian army defeated at Carchemish. It was fought near the ancient city Hamath on the Orontes.

In this battle, Nebuchadnezzar further shattered the remnants of Necho II's Egyptian army that he had previously defeated in the Battle of Carchemish. The battle is mentioned in the Babylonian Chronicles, now housed in the British Museum. In the Chronicles it states that Nebuchadnezzar II killed almost all of the Egyptian combatants, so exhausted that none of them returned to their own country. The Chronicles do not mention Necho and the Bible only mentions 'Necho's army', and it is possible that Necho wasn't present and the Egyptian army was just a garrison army. He was dealing with various rebellions in the delta.
