= Ancient Egyptian trade =

Commerce with Mesopotamia, India, Arabia and Africa

Ancient Egyptian trade developed with the gradual creation of land and sea trade routes connecting the ancient Egyptian civilization with ancient India, the Fertile Crescent, Arabia and Sub-Saharan Africa.

== Prehistoric transport and trade ==
Epipaleolithic Natufians carried parthenocarpic figs from Africa to the southeastern corner of the Fertile Crescent, c. 10,000 BCE. Later migrations out of the Fertile Crescent would carry early agricultural practices to neighboring regions—westward to Europe and North Africa, northward to Crimea, and eastward to Mongolia.

The ancient people of the Sahara imported domesticated animals from Asia between 6000 and 4000 BCE. In Nabta Playa by the end of the 7th millennium BCE, prehistoric Egyptians had imported goats and sheep from Southwest Asia.

Foreign artifacts dating to the 5th millennium BCE in the Badarian culture in Egypt indicate contact with distant Syria. In predynastic Egypt, by the beginning of the 4th millennium BCE, ancient Egyptians in Maadi were importing pottery as well as construction ideas from Canaan.

By the 4th millennium BCE shipping was well established, and the donkey and possibly the dromedary had been domesticated. Domestication of the Bactrian camel and use of the horse for transport then followed. Charcoal samples found in the tombs of Nekhen, which were dated to the Naqada I and II periods, have been identified as cedar from Lebanon. Predynastic Egyptians of the Naqada I period also imported obsidian from Ethiopia, used to shape blades and other objects from flakes. The Naqadans traded with Nubia to the south, the oases of the western desert to the west, and the cultures of the eastern Mediterranean to the east.

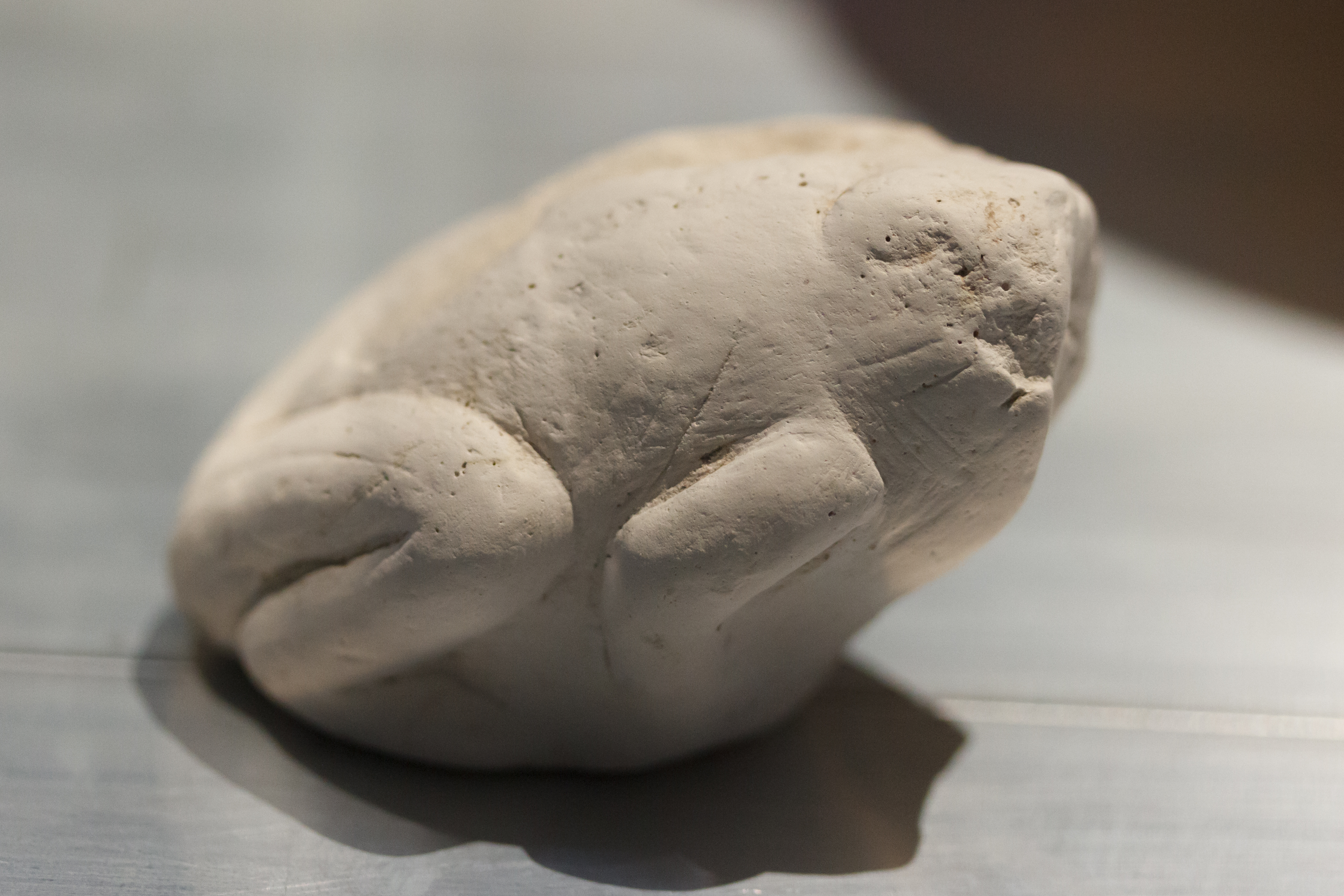
A limestone carving of a frog was discovered at Tell es-Sakan in Palestine amongst material dated to the last third of the 4th millennium BCE, at which point the site was an Egyptian settlement. It may be a votive figure dedicated to Heqet, an Egyptian goddess with the head of a frog.

Pottery and other artifacts from the Levant that date to the Naqadan era have been found in ancient Egypt. Egyptian artifacts dating to this era have been found in Canaan and other regions of the Near East, including Tell Brak, Uruk and Susa in Mesopotamia. Tell es-Sakan was an Egyptian settlement in the southern Levant (present-day Palestine) and acted as a trading post for goods travelling between the region and Egypt.

By the second half of the 4th millennium BCE, the gemstone lapis lazuli was being traded from its only known source in the ancient world—Badakhshan, in what is now northeastern Afghanistan—as far as Mesopotamia and Egypt.

== Trans-Saharan trade ==
The overland route through the Wadi Hammamat from the Nile to the Red Sea was known as early as predynastic times; drawings depicting Egyptian reed boats have been found along the path dating to 4000 BCE. Ancient cities dating to the First Dynasty of Egypt arose along both its Nile and Red Sea junctions, testifying to the route's ancient popularity. It became a major route from Thebes to the Red Sea port of Elim, where travelers then moved on to either Asia, Arabia or the Horn of Africa. Records exist documenting knowledge of the route among Senusret I, Seti, Ramesses IV and also, later, the Roman Empire, especially for mining.

The Darb el-Arbain trade route, passing through Kharga in the south and Asyut in the north, was used from as early as the Old Kingdom of Egypt for the transport and trade of gold, ivory, spices, wheat, animals and plants. Later, Ancient Romans would protect the route by lining it with varied forts and small outposts, some guarding large settlements complete with cultivation. Described by Herodotus as a road "traversed ... in forty days", it became by his time an important land route facilitating trade between Nubia and Egypt. Its maximum extent was northward from Kobbei, 25 miles north of al-Fashir, passing through the desert, through Bir Natrum and Wadi Howar, and ending in Egypt.

== Maritime trade ==
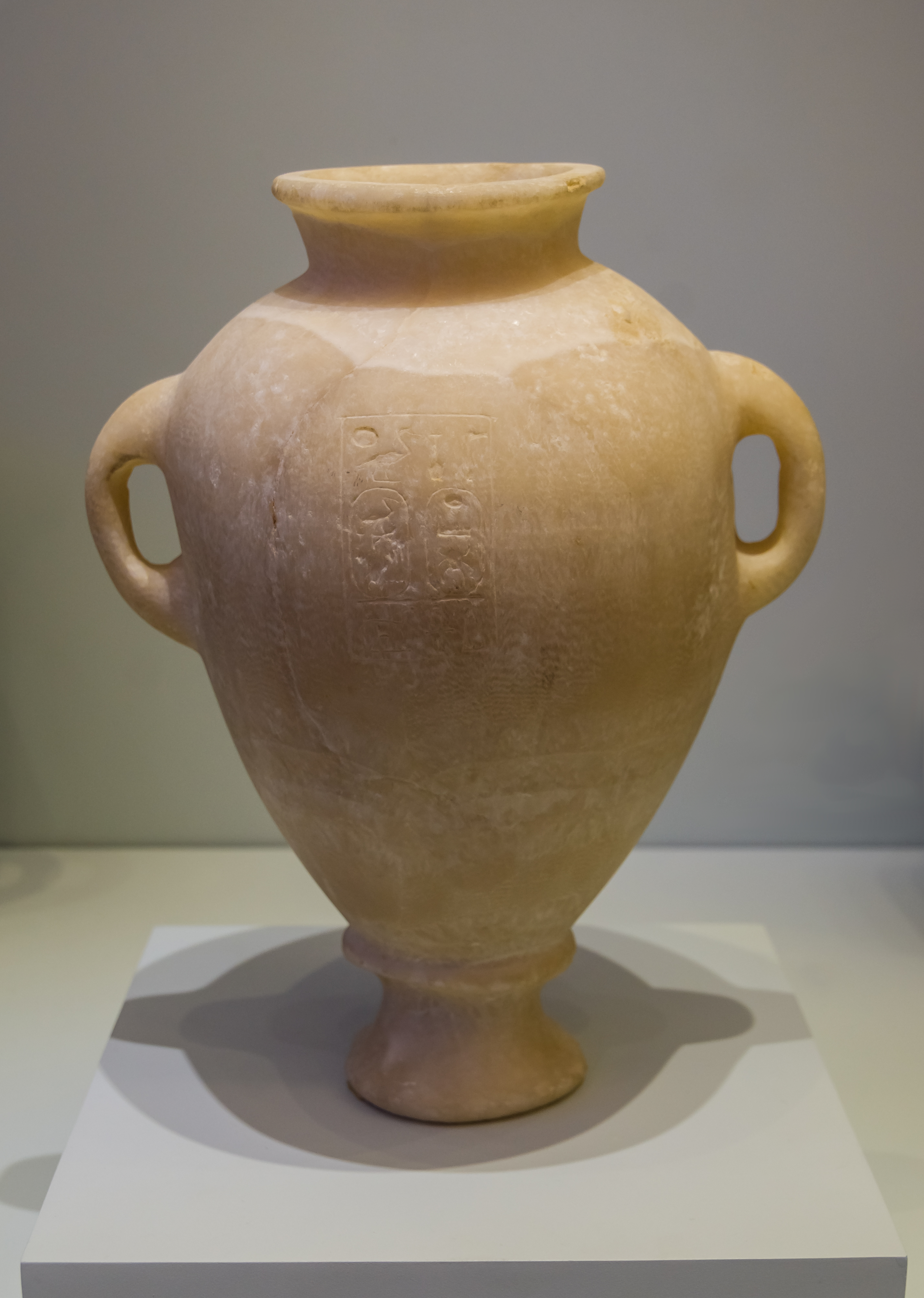
Egyptian alabaster amphora found in Katsambas-Poros, Crete in the context of 1400–1375 BCE. It carries incised hieroglyphic inscriptions bearing the name of Pharaoh Tuthmosis III (1479–1425 BCE) in two cartouches. "The virtuous god Men-Heper-Re, Son of the Sun, Tuthmosis, the fair one in the transformations, Endowed with eternal life". Heraklion Archaeological Museum

Shipbuilding was known to the Ancient Egyptians as early as 3000 BCE, and perhaps earlier. Ancient Egyptians knew how to assemble planks of wood into a ship hull, with woven straps used to lash the planks together, and reeds or grass stuffed between the planks helped to seal the seams. The Archaeological Institute of America reports that the earliest dated ship—75 feet long, dating to 3000 BCE—may have possibly belonged to Pharaoh Aha.

An Egyptian colony stationed in southern Canaan dates to slightly before the First Dynasty. Narmer had Egyptian pottery produced in Canaan—with his name stamped on vessels—and exported back to Egypt, from regions such as Arad, En Besor, Rafiah, and Tel Erani. In 1994, excavators discovered an incised ceramic shard with the serekh sign of Narmer, dating to c. 3000 BCE. Mineralogical studies reveal the shard to be a fragment of a wine jar exported from the Nile valley to Palestine. Due to Egypt's climate, wine was very rare and nearly impossible to produce within the limits of Egypt. In order to obtain wine, Egyptians had to import it from Greece, Phoenicia, and Palestine. These early friendships played a key role in Egypt's ability to conduct trade and acquire goods that were needed.

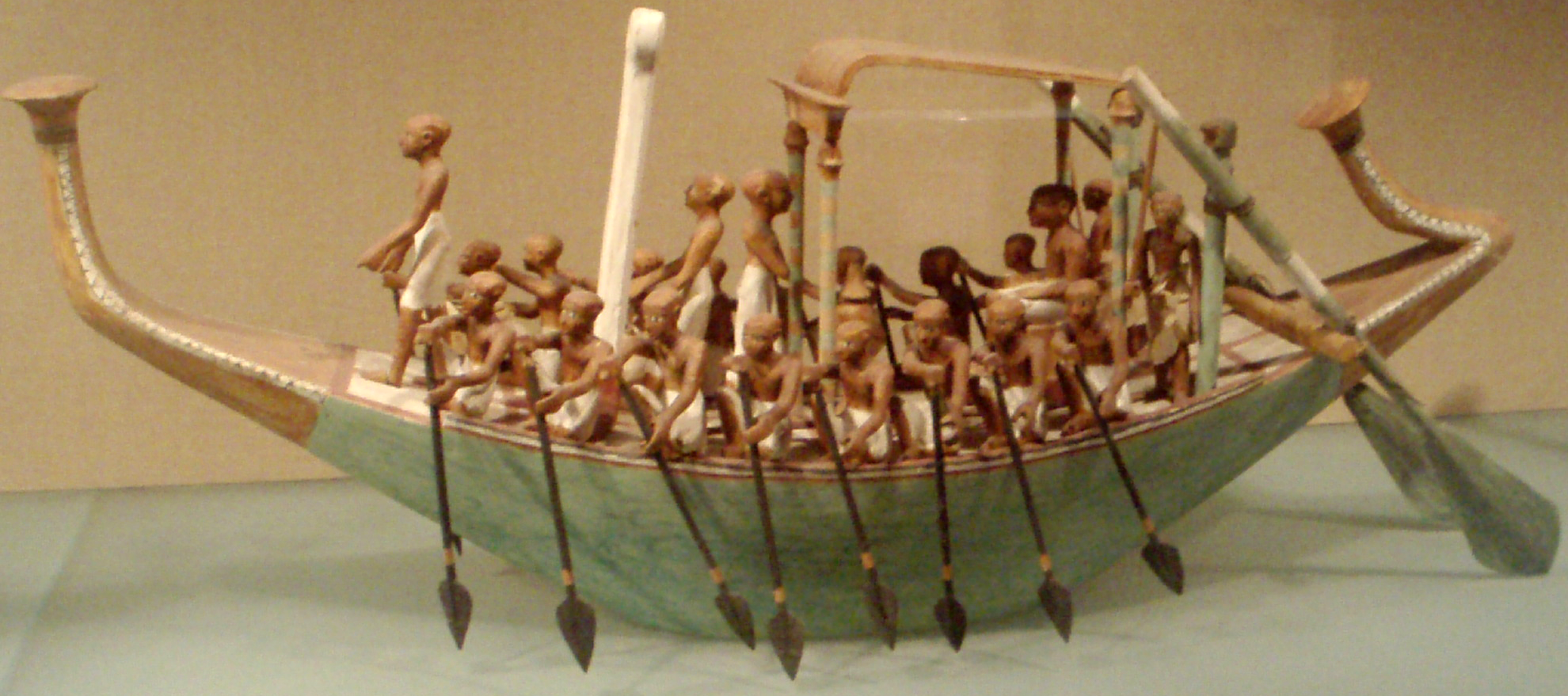
Model of a paddling funerary boat from the tomb of Meketre. From the time of the Twelfth dynasty of Egypt, early in the reign of Amenemhat I, circa 1931–1975 BCE.

The Palermo stone mentions King Sneferu of the Fourth Dynasty sending ships to import high-quality cedar from Lebanon. In one scene in the pyramid of Pharaoh Sahure of the Fifth Dynasty, Egyptians are returning with huge cedar trees. Sahure's name is found stamped on a thin piece of gold on a Lebanon chair, and 5th dynasty cartouches were found in Lebanon stone vessels. Other scenes in his temple depict Syrian bears. The Palermo stone also mentions expeditions to Sinai as well as to the diorite quarries northwest of Abu Simbel.

The oldest known expedition to the Land of Punt was organized by Sahure, which apparently yielded a quantity of myrrh, along with malachite and electrum. Around 1950 BCE, in the reign of Mentuhotep III, an officer named Hennu made one or more voyages to Punt. In the 15th century BCE, Nehsi conducted a very famous expedition for Queen Hatshepsut to obtain myrrh; a report of that voyage survives on a relief in Hatshepsut's funerary temple at Deir el-Bahri. Several of her successors, including Thutmoses III, also organized expeditions to Punt.

== Canal construction ==
The legendary Sesostris (likely either Pharaoh Senusret II or Senusret III of the Twelfth Dynasty of Egypt) is said to have started work on an ancient "Suez" Canal joining the River Nile with the Red Sea. This ancient account is corroborated by Aristotle, Pliny the Elder, and Strabo.

None of their kings tried to make a canal to it (for it would have been of no little advantage to them for the whole region to have become navigable; Sesostris is said to have been the first of the ancient kings to try), but he found that the sea was higher than the land. So he first, and Darius afterwards, stopped making the canal, lest the sea should mix with the river water and spoil it.

165. Next comes the Tyro tribe and, on the Red Sea, the harbour of the Daneoi, from which Sesostris, king of Egypt, intended to carry a ship-canal to where the Nile flows into what is known as the Delta; this is a distance of over 60 miles. Later the Persian king Darius had the same idea, and yet again Ptolemy II, who made a trench 100 feet wide, 30 feet deep and about 35 miles long, as far as the Bitter Lakes.

Remnants of an ancient west–east canal, running through the ancient Egyptian cities of Bubastis, Pi-Ramesses, and Pithom were discovered by Napoleon Bonaparte and his cadre of engineers and cartographers in 1799. Other evidence seems to indicate the existence of an ancient canal around the 13th century BC, during the time of Ramesses II. Later construction efforts continued during the reigns of Necho II, Darius I of Persia and Ptolemy II Philadelphus.

Psammetichus left a son called Necos, who succeeded him upon the throne. This prince was the first to attempt the construction of the canal to the Red Sea—a work completed afterwards by Darius the Persian—the length of which is four days' journey, and the width is such as to admit of two triremes being rowed along it abreast. The water is derived from the Nile, which the canal leaves a little above the city of Bubastis, near Patumus, the Arabian town, being continued thence until it joins the Red Sea.

This [the canal from the Nile to the Red Sea] was begun by Necho II [610 BCE – 595 BCE], and completed by Darius I, who set up stelae c. 490 [BCE], ... and later restored by Ptolemy II Philadelphus, Trajan and Hadrian, and Amr ibn el-'Asi, the Muslim conqueror of Egypt. Its length from Tell el-Maskhuta to Suez was about 85 km (52.82 mi).

Shipping over the Nile River and from Old Cairo and through Suez continued further through the efforts of either 'Amr ibn al-'As, Omar, or Trajan. The Abbasid Caliph al-Mansur is said to have ordered this ancient canal closed so as to prevent supplies from reaching Arabian detractors.

== Bibliography ==
- Graciela Gestoso Singer, El Intercambio de Bienes entre Egipto y Asia Anterior: Desde el reinado de Tuthmosis III hasta el de Akhenaton (The Exchange of Goods between Egypt and the Near East: From the reign of Thutmose III to that of Akhenaten), Ancient Near East Monographs 2 (2008) Society of Biblical Literature (SBL) from the Official SBL website
