= Battle of Quramati =

Ancient battle in the region of Syria

- Part of the Egyptian–Babylonian wars
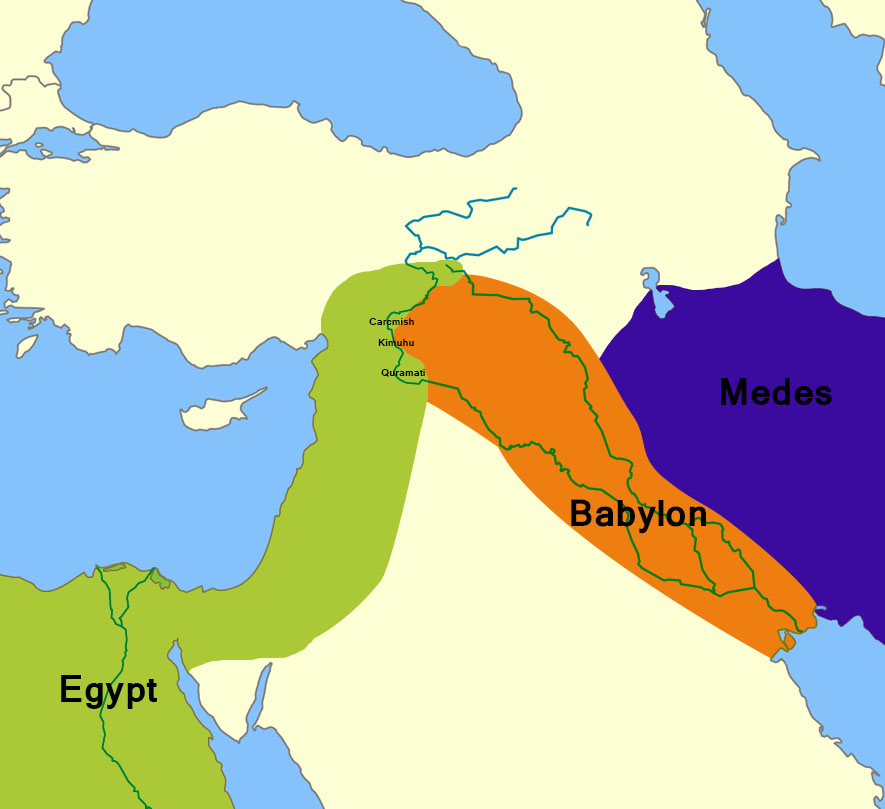
- Circles of influence after the battle
Date	c. 605 BC
Location	Euphrates
Result	Egyptian victory

Belligerents
Egypt	Babylonia; Medes

Casualties and losses
Minimal	Large

The Battle of Quramati was a battle around 605 BC that took place on the east of the Euphrates River between the Egyptian army and the Babylonian army. The battle ended with the defeat of the Babylonians.

== Background ==
When the Assyrian capital Nineveh was overrun by the Medes, Scythians, Babylonians and their allies in 612 BC, the Assyrians moved their capital to Harran. When Harran was captured by the alliance in 609 BC, ending the Assyrian Empire, remnants of the Assyrian army joined Carchemish, a city under Egyptian rule, on the Euphrates river. Egypt, then under the rule of Necho II, was allied with the Assyrian king Ashur-uballit II, and marched in 609 BC to his aid against the Babylonians.

== Battle ==
The Egyptian army moved in the spring of 606 BC to besiege and occupy Kimuhu. “Nebulaser did not help his besieged army in Kimoho, perhaps for fear that the Babylonian army would perish because of the risk it would take in crossing the Euphrates River and meeting the Egyptian army west of the river.” The city of Kimuhu fell into the hands of the Egyptians after being besieged for a period of four months. In response to this, the Babylonian army encamped in the city of Quramati and in September 606 BC Babylonian forces crossed the river and took control of the city of Chondari, located to the west of the river, but the Egyptian response came quickly with a counterattack, as the Egyptian army crossed the river and occupied the city of Quramati east of the river. The Babylonian army withdrew from the west of the Euphrates fearing that the Egyptian army would besiege them and eliminate them completely.
