= Siege of Kimuhu =

Siege in the Neo-Babylonian empire

The Egyptian-Babylonian War
Date	606 BC
Location	Ancient Near East
Result	Egyptian victory

Belligerents
Twenty-sixth Dynasty of Egypt	Neo-Babylonian Empire; Persians; Scythians; Medes

The siege of Kimuhu is a siege launched by the Egyptian army led by Necho II on the city of Kimukho east of the Euphrates River, where the Egyptian army besieged the city for four months, and the siege ended with the surrender of the Babylonian garrison and the city under Egyptian control.

== Battle background ==
Necho II had become king of Egypt, so he continued his father's policy in aiding Assyria, and in order to give Egypt a voice in the politics of the ancient East, and to keep the weak Assyria as a barrier between him and the new dangerous powers in the East, and finally to restore the empire Egyptian lost in Syria and Palestine. Thus Nechau II hastened to help Assyria, and the fates desired that the country which had been the target of the Assyrians for two generations before, should now be their only help. In the year 609 BC, Necho II emerged as a strong and main opponent of the king of Babylon, Nabu-laser (626-605 BC. M), and soon the Egyptian forces under the leadership of the pharaoh himself advanced towards Harran to rescue the king of Assyria.

In 609 BC, the Assyrian king Ashur-Upalit II retook Harran with Egyptian support and the battle ended with the defeat of the Babylonians.

== Battle ==
The Egyptian army defeated the Babylonian forces. In 606 BC, the Egyptian army besieged the city of Kimukho for 4 months until it fell and occupied Kimukho, south of Carchemish in Syria, with the Babylonian garrison. Later in the year, the Egyptian force crossed the Euphrates and defeated the Babylonian army at Quramati, south and east of Kimuhu.

=== Judah ===
There, in Megiddo, Josiah, king of Judah, objected to the Egyptian army, and Nechau warned him of the goodness, but he did not yield to him. Thus, the Egyptian army met the army of Judah in a battle in which victory was written for the Egyptians. Josiah paid his life for his adventure, as Judah paid the price for her mistake. In estimating the real power of Egypt, and Palestine became subject to Egypt, it is correct to say that Egypt recovered Palestine. Nechau continued his march in central and northern Syria to make a last attempt to help Assyria against Babylon, but he succeeded in subjugating the Assyrian cities in Syria and the cities on the Phoenician coast, and this facilitated his possession of a fleet in the Mediterranean. The pharaoh received a large compensation from Judah, then appointed Eliakim in the place of his brother, then Necho landed with the property of the House of David.
