= Nabopolassar =

Founder and first king of the Neo-Babylonian Empire

- King of Babylon; King of Sumer and Akkad; King of the Universe

King of the Neo-Babylonian Empire
- Reign: 23 November 626 BC – 15 August 605 BC
- Coronation: 23 November 626 BC
- Predecessor: Sinsharishkun (Neo-Assyrian Empire)
- Successor: Nebuchadnezzar II
- Born: c. 658 BC; Uruk (?)
- Died: 15 August 605 BC (aged c. 52/53); Babylon
- Issue: Nebuchadnezzar II; Nabu-shum-lishir; Nabu-zer-ushabshi
- Akkadian: Nabû-apla-uṣur
- Dynasty: Chaldean dynasty
- Father: Nebuchadnezzar (?)

Nabopolassar (Neo-Babylonian Akkadian: 𒀭𒉺𒀀𒉽, romanized: Nabû-apla-uṣur, meaning "Nabu, protect the son") was the founder and first king of the Neo-Babylonian Empire, ruling from his coronation as king of Babylon in 626 BC to his death in 605 BC. Though initially only aimed at restoring and securing the independence of Babylonia, Nabopolassar's uprising against the Neo-Assyrian Empire, which had ruled Babylonia for more than a century, eventually led to the complete destruction of the Assyrian Empire and the rise of the Neo-Babylonian Empire in its place.

Of unclear, possibly Chaldean, origin and potentially connected to a powerful political family in the southern city of Uruk, Nabopolassar revolted against the Neo-Assyrian king Sinsharishkun at an opportune moment when Babylonia was already plagued by political instability. Though the advantage shifted back and forth dramatically several times, Nabopolassar managed to decisively push the Assyrians out of Babylonia after nearly ten years of fighting. Subsequent campaigns were intended to hinder the possibility of an Assyrian campaign directed at Babylonia through securing the border, but the intervention of the eastern Median Empire under Cyaxares in Nabopolassar's favor shifted the goals and the possibilities of the war.

In 614 BC, the Medes brutally sacked the city of Assur, the religious and ceremonial heart of Assyria, and in 612 BC the Medes and Babylonians assaulted Nineveh, Assyria's capital. As with Assur before it, Nineveh was brutally sacked, with its inhabitants, including children, slaughtered en masse and the entire city being burned to the ground. Sinsharishkun probably died in its defense. Other Assyrian cities, such as Nimrud, were also assaulted and sacked much in the same way. The brutality of the Medes, including their habit of sacking even the religious temples, was so excessive that it shocked the Babylonians; contemporary Babylonian chronicles, otherwise hostile to the Assyrians, lament the sackings with sorrow and remorse. Nabopolassar's own attitude towards Assyria is unclear; in some inscriptions he is careful to ascribe his victory and its aftermath to divine intervention to rid himself of the blame, while in others he openly boasts of the destruction.

The Neo-Babylonian Empire's claim to succeed the Neo-Assyrian Empire was immediately challenged by Egypt under Pharaoh Necho II, who fought for several years to restore the Assyrians, whom he was allied to, until he was defeated at the Battle of Carchemish in 605 BC. Upon his death that same year, Nabopolassar was succeeded by his son Nebuchadnezzar II. As the founder of the Neo-Babylonian Empire, Nabopolassar was long remembered by the Babylonians after his death, even beyond the fall of his empire less than a century later. In the Hellenistic period, several centuries later, Nabopolassar's legend was still remembered, with Babylonian authors casting him as a champion ordered by Marduk, Babylon's chief deity, to avenge their homeland, and as a symbol against the domination of foreign empires over Babylon.

== Background ==
=== Origin and ancestry ===
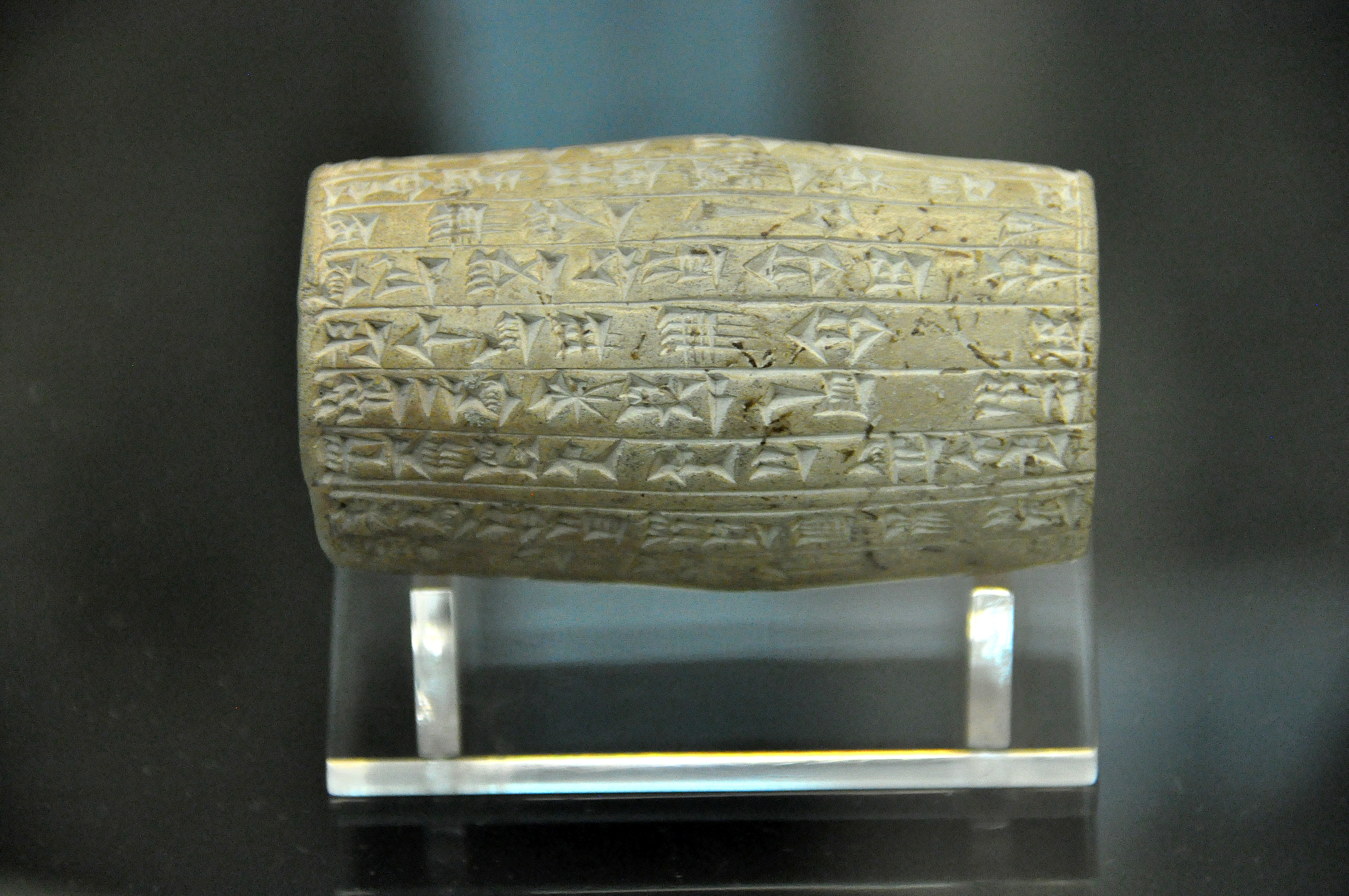
Clay cylinder of Nabopolassar from Babylon

Nabopolassar's origins are unclear. In his own inscriptions, he refers to himself as a mâr lā mammâna ("son of a nobody"), a striking descriptor that is not known from any other Mesopotamian king. The two other Neo-Babylonian kings who had no blood connection to previous royalty; Neriglissar (r. 560–556 BC) and Nabonidus (r. 556–539 BC), nevertheless mentioned the names of their fathers and wrote about them with pride in their inscriptions. On account of a lack of sources in regards to his true origins, subsequent historians have variously identified Nabopolassar as a Chaldean, an Assyrian or a Babylonian. Although no evidence conclusively confirms him as being of Chaldean origin, the term "Chaldean dynasty" is frequently used by modern historians for the royal family he founded, and the term "Chaldean Empire" remains in use as an alternate historiographical name for the Neo-Babylonian Empire. Several near-contemporary texts, such as the Uruk prophecy, describe Nabopolassar as a "king of the sea", i.e. of southernmost Babylonia, suggesting that his origin was south of Babylon itself. The Assyrians also ascribed him a southern origin; a letter from the Neo-Assyrian king Sinsharishkun (r. 627–612 BC) describes Nabopolassar as "of the lower sea", i.e. southernmost Mesopotamia.

==== Connection to Uruk ====
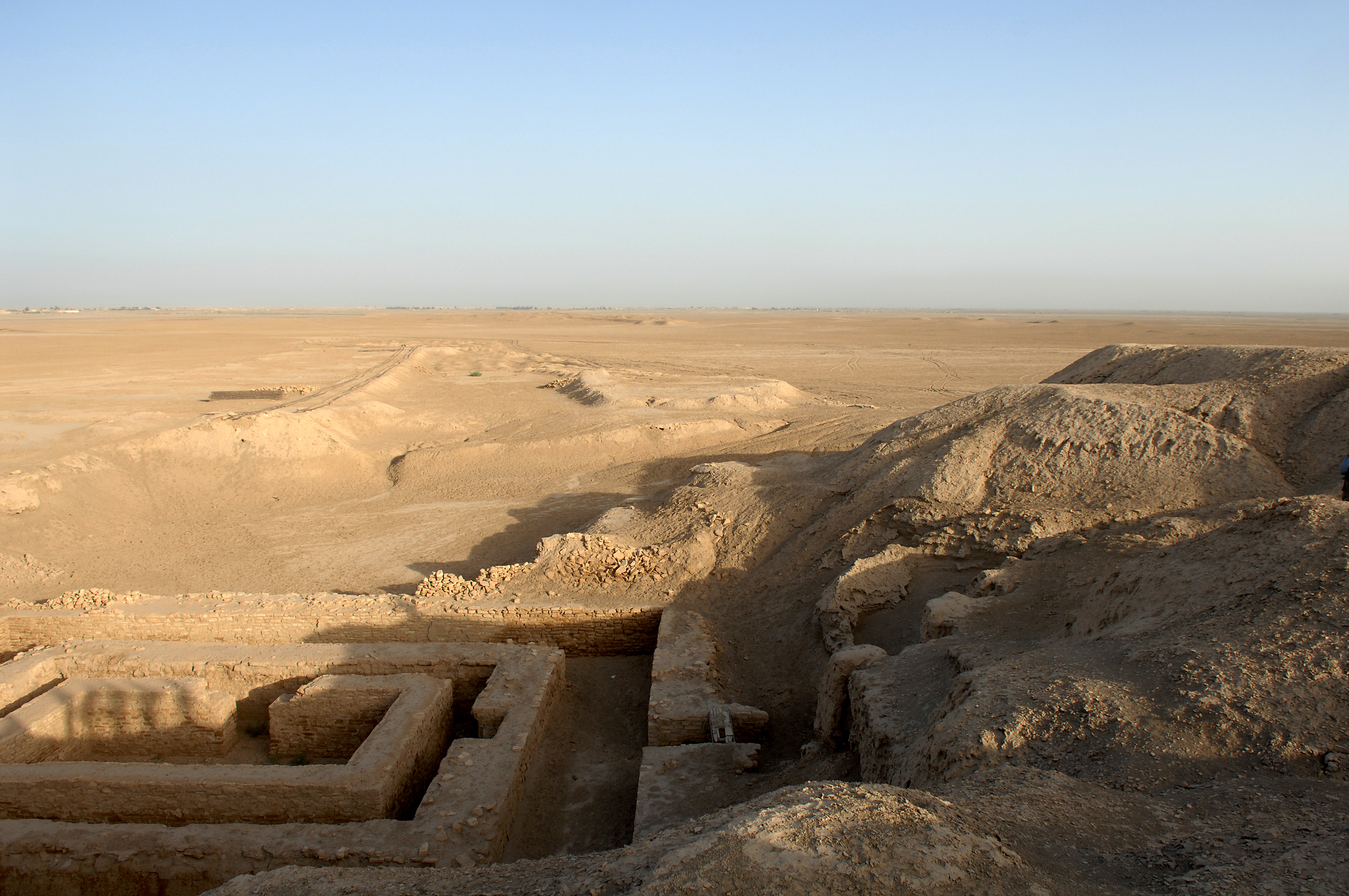
The ruins of the city of Uruk, where Nabopolassar and his family may have originated

Regardless of his ethnic origin, Nabopolassar appears to have been strongly connected to the city of Uruk, located south of Babylon, possibly having been a member of its ruling elite prior to becoming Babylon's king. In a 1998 paper, the Assyriologist Paul-Alain Beaulieu mentioned that there was a growing body of evidence that Nabopolassar's family originated in Uruk, and also presented evidence that several of Nebuchadnezzar II's (Nabopolassar's son and successor) daughters lived in the city. In 2007, the Assyriologist Michael Jursa advanced the theory that Nabopolassar was a member of a prominent political family in Uruk, whose members are attested since the reign of Esarhaddon (r. 681–669 BC). To support his theory, Jursa points to a letter from the time of Sinsharishkun, ABL 469, which discusses how the grave and body of Kudurru, a deceased governor of Uruk, was desecrated due to the anti-Assyrian activities of Kudurru's two sons, Nabu-shumu-ukin and a son whose name is mostly missing. The desecration went so far as to drag Kudurru's body through the streets of Uruk. Kudurru can be identified with Nebuchadnezzar (Nabû-kudurri-uṣur, "Kudurru" simply being a common and shortened nickname), a prominent official in Uruk who served as its governor under Ashurbanipal (r. 669–631 BC) in the 640s BC.

In Assyrian tradition, the desecration of a dead body showed that the deceased individual and their surviving family were traitors and enemies of the state, and that they had to be completely eradicated. The desecration of the body itself functioned as a means to punish an enemy even after their death. The name of the son whose name is unpreserved in the letter ended with either ahi, nâsir or uṣur, and the remaining traces can fit with the name Nabû-apla-uṣur, meaning that Nabopolassar could be the other son mentioned in the letter and thus a son of Kudurru. Strengthening the case that Kudurru was Nabopolassar's father is the name of Nabopolassar's son, also Nebuchadnezzar. At this time, Nebuchadnezzar was a very rare name in Babylonia. Since the Babylonians employed papponymy, it is possible that Nabopolassar would have named his son after his father. Before becoming king after Nabopolassar's death, Nebuchadnezzar II served as the high priest of the Eanna temple in Uruk, often attested there under the nickname Kudurru, further linking Nabopolassar's dynasty both to Uruk and to Kudurru. Additionally, the name of Kudurru's second son, Nabu-shumu-ukin, is also the name of a prominent general under Nabopolassar (a role not unlikely to be filled by a family member) and the name of one of Nebuchadnezzar II's sons (possibly another example of a name honoring a relative).

The ancient author Berossus, a native Babylonian historian active in Hellenistic times, centuries after Nabopolassar, described Nabopolassar as a general of Sinsharishkun, who betrayed the Assyrian king. Berossus is not typically considered reliable, but there was ample Assyrian influence within the Neo-Babylonian Empire, with there being considerable continuity within military and court administration. Jursa does not consider this surprising; Nabopolassar's ancestors, such as Kudurru, had been pro-Assyrian in their policies (Kudurru even having been appointed by Ashurbanipal himself); Kudurru even fought in Ashurbanipal's civil war against his brother Shamash-shum-ukin (designated by their father Esarhaddon as king of Babylon), aiding in the defeat of the latter. Kudurru's support for Assyria could explain Nabopolassar's unwillingness to mention his father in his inscriptions, and the desecration of his father's body additionally meant that Nabopolassar in a literal sense no longer had a father.

=== The Babylonian problem ===
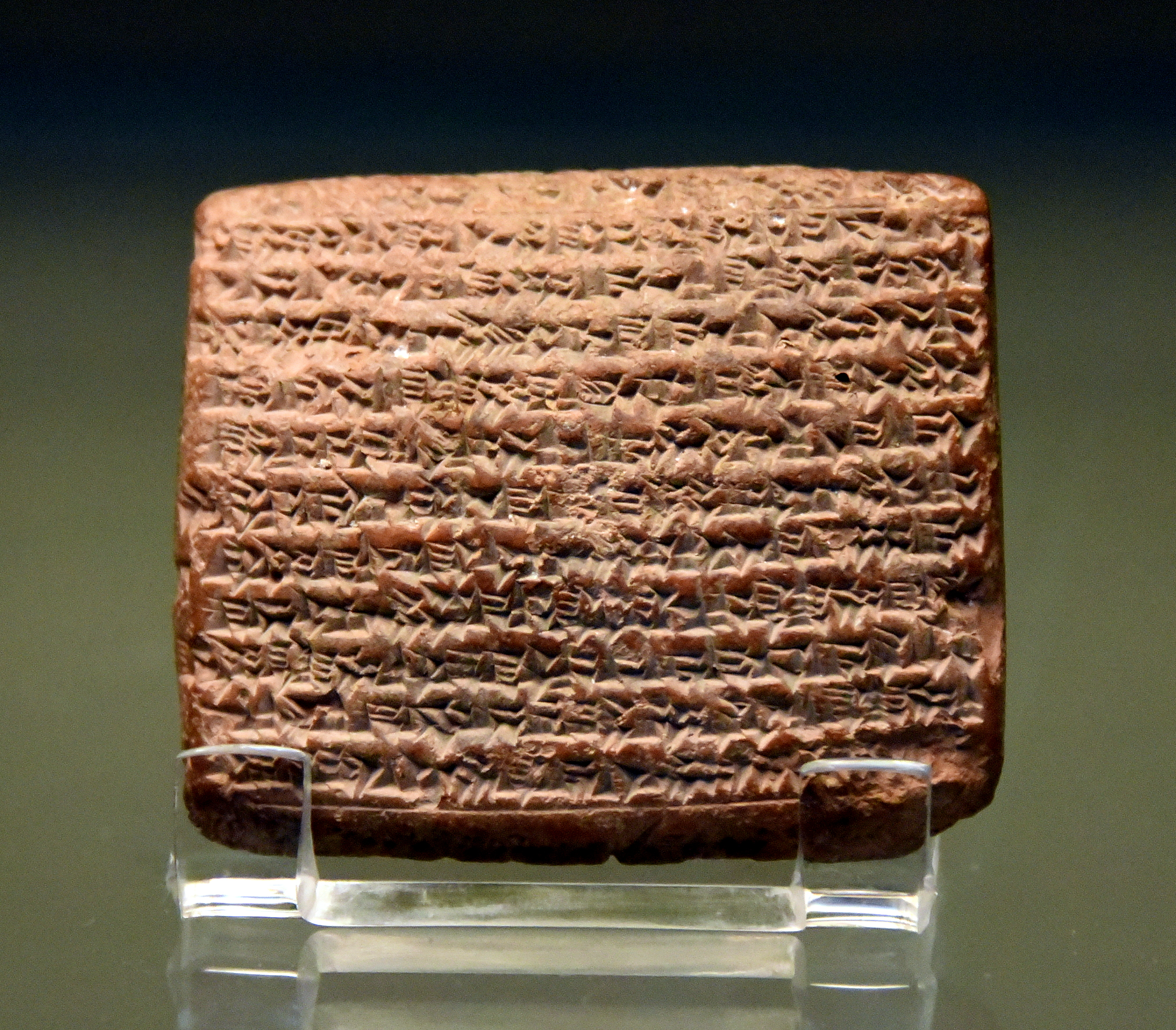
The so-called "Chronicle of Nabopolassar". The cuneiform inscriptions on this clay tablet narrate the chronicle of the years 608-605 BC. After the fall of Nineveh, Naboplolassar vied with Egypt to control Assyria's western territories. His death stopped the campaign and sent his son Nebuchadnezzar II back to Babylon to claim the throne

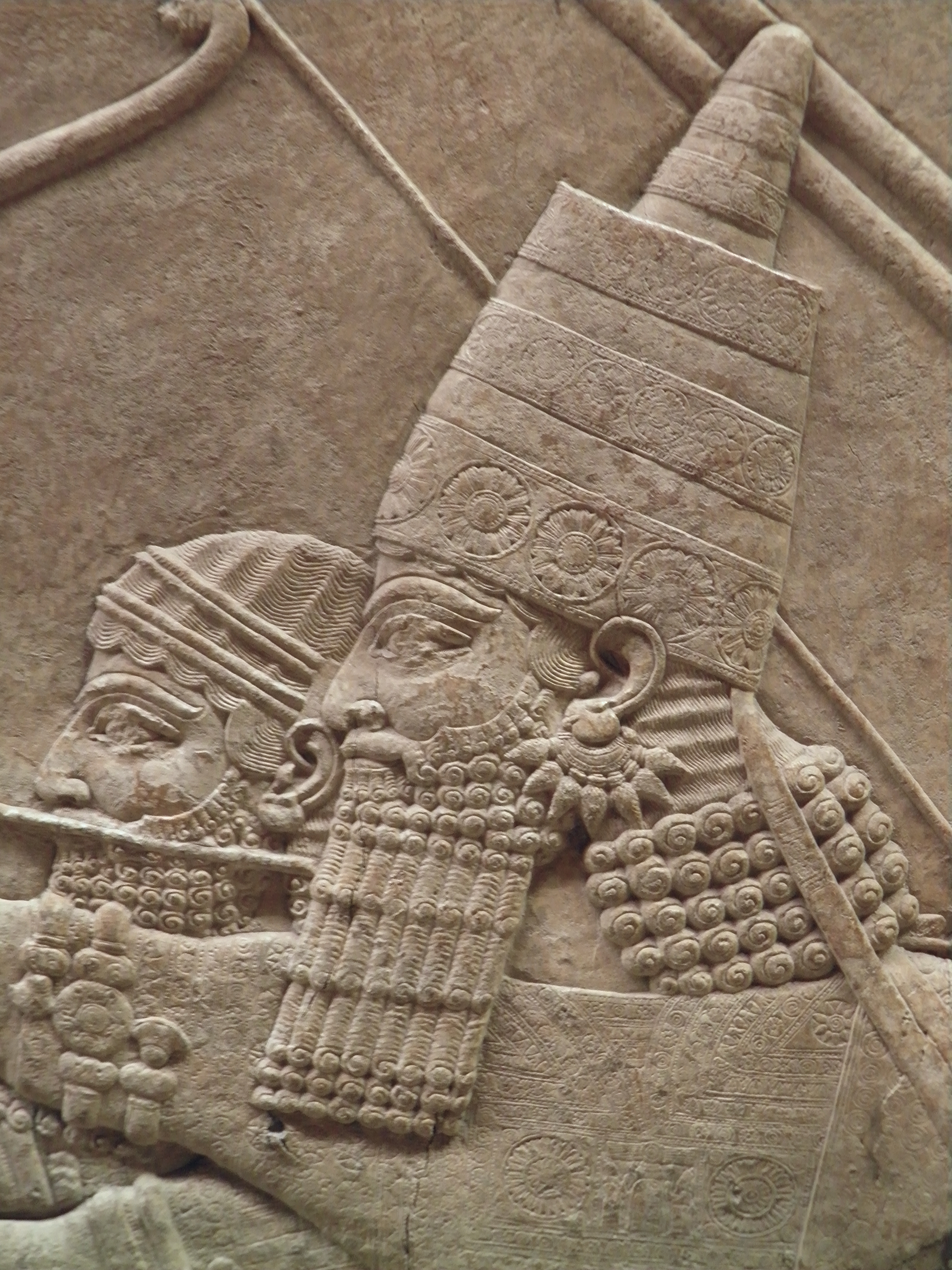
In the latter part of the Neo-Assyrian king Ashurbanipal's (pictured) reign, when Babylonia was governed by his appointed vassal king Kandalanu, Assyria and Babylonia enjoyed a long period of peace. Nabopolassar's revolt began in the period of turmoil following the deaths of both Ashurbanipal and Kandalanu.

In the middle of the seventh century BC, the Neo-Assyrian Empire ruled the entire Near East. Due to their powerful standing army and their sophisticated administration, the Assyrians had managed to create the best organized and largest empire that the world had yet seen. Though Babylonia in the south had also once been a large kingdom, it had typically been weaker than its northern neighbor due to internal divisions and the lack of a well-organized army. The population of Babylonia was divided into various ethnic groups with different priorities and ideals. Though old native Babylonians ruled most of the cities, such as Kish, Ur, Uruk, Borsippa, Nippur, and Babylon itself, the Chaldean tribes, led by chieftains who often squabbled with each other, dominated most of the southernmost land. The Arameans lived on the fringes of settled land and were notorious for plundering surrounding territories. Because of the infighting of these three major groups, Babylonia often represented an appealing target for Assyrian campaigns. The two kingdoms had competed since the rise of the Middle Assyrian Empire in the 14th century BC, and in the 8th century BC, the Assyrians consistently gained the upper hand. Babylon's internal and external weakness led to its conquest by the Assyrian king Tiglath-Pileser III in 729 BC.

During the expansion of Assyria into a major empire, the Assyrians had conquered various neighboring kingdoms, either annexing them as Assyrian provinces or turning them into vassal states. Because the Assyrians venerated the long history and culture of Babylon, it was preserved as a full kingdom, either ruled by an appointed client king, or by the Assyrian king in a personal union. The relationship between Assyria and Babylonia was similar to the relationship between Greece and Rome in later centuries; much of Assyria's culture, texts and traditions had been imported from the south. Assyria and Babylonia also shared the same language (Akkadian). The relationship between Assyria and Babylon was emotional in a sense; Neo-Assyrian inscriptions implicitly gender the two countries, calling Assyria the metaphorical "husband" and Babylon its "wife". In the words of the Assyriologist Eckart Frahm, "the Assyrians were in love with Babylon, but also wished to dominate her". Though Babylon was respected as the well-spring of civilization, it was expected to remain passive in political matters, something that Assyria's "Babylonian bride" repeatedly refused to be.

The Assyrians attempted various strategies to appease their Babylonian subjects throughout the eighth and seventh centuries BC; ranging from violent subjugation through war to direct rule either by the Assyrian king or by a representative (sometimes a relative such as a son or brother). Though there was some success in pacifying the urban population of Babylonians, the Arameans and Chaldeans remained unconvinced and repeatedly rebelled whenever they saw an opportunity. Despite the enormous effort spent in keeping the region, Babylonia was seen as too important economically and strategically to allow to secede, but no matter what the Assyrians attempted, rebellion and civil war was the inevitable result each time. Prolonged Assyrian control of Babylonia proved so impossible that modern researchers have dubbed it the "Babylonian problem".

In 631 BC, the long-ruling Assyrian king Ashurbanipal died and in 627 BC, he was followed in death by his appointed vassal ruler of Babylonia, Kandalanu. Their deaths ended an about 20-year long period of relative peace and stability. Ashurbanipal was first succeeded by his son Ashur-etil-ilani, but he died in 627 BC at around the same time as Kandalanu, leading to Ashurbanipal's other son, Sinsharishkun, assuming the kingship of Assyria. Although it has been suggested by several historians, there is no evidence to prove the idea that Ashur-etil-ilani was deposed in a coup by his brother. Sinsharishkun's inscriptions state that he was selected for the kingship from among several of "his equals" (i.e., his brothers) by the gods. Almost immediately after Sinsharishkun's rise to the throne, the general Sin-shumu-lishir rebelled. Sin-shumu-lishir took some cities in northern Babylonia, including Nippur and Babylon and ruled there for three months before Sinsharishkun defeated him. Though both of them exercised control there, it is unclear if Sinsharishkun and Sin-shumu-lishir actually claimed the title "king of Babylon" (or only used "king of Assyria"), meaning that Babylonia could have experienced an interregnum of sorts. Modern historians typically include both Sin-shumu-lishir and Sinsharishkun in lists of Babylonian kings, as did some ancient Babylonian king lists.

== Sources ==
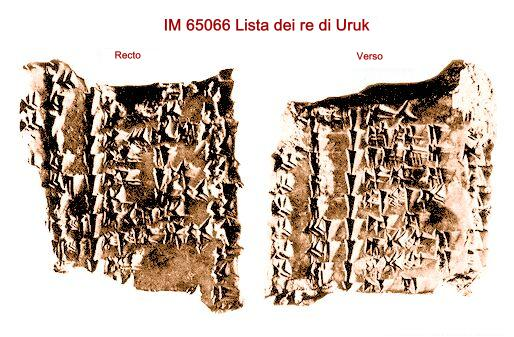
The Uruk King List (pictured), which records the lengths of the reigns of Babylonian monarchs from the 7th to 3rd century BC, is one of the sources that can be used to date Nabopolassar's reign.

As a consequence of the turbulent times in which he reigned, and the violent downfall of Assyria, comparatively few sources survive from Nabopolassar's reign. The near-contemporary sources that do survive include two Babylonian chronicles (written from the point of view of the victorious Babylonians); the Nabopolassar Chronicle and the Fall of Nineveh Chronicle, as well as royal inscriptions and economic and administrative texts. In terms of reconstructing the succession of events in the period of Assyria's downfall, the Babylonian chronicles are the most important source, though they do not cover all of Nabopolassar's reign, only reveal select facts and are written in a terse and objective style. Around 1,500 administrative and economical texts are known from Nabopolassar's reign, most recovered from excavated temple archives in Uruk and Sippar, but they do not record much of events on a geopolitical scale. Inscriptions that record Nabopolassar's building projects or his piety, recovered at several sites throughout Babylonia, do not mention much about geopolitical events either.

Later works, such as the works of Berossus, the Bible, and the works of ancient Greek historians such as Ctesias, Herodotus and Xenophon, corroborate details mentioned in the earlier Babylonian sources, but do not offer any meaningful additional commentary or insight.

In terms of dating, several sources can be used to confidently determine the timespan in which Nabopolassar ruled as king of Babylon, chiefly the Uruk King List (also known as King List 5) and the Ptolemaic Canon of Kings. In the Uruk list, the length of the reigns of each Babylonian king, from the 7th to the 3rd century BC, are recorded. The Ptolemaic Canon lists rulers of Babylonia, followed by the Achaemenid Persian kings and the Ptolemaic dynasty of Egypt. As the Canon lists and documents astronomical phenomena, it is an important document for dating events in the entire chronology of the ancient Near East. Contemporary Babylonian astronomical texts can also be used to a certain extent as they record astronomical phenomena and sometimes also political events.

== Reign ==
=== War for Babylonia ===
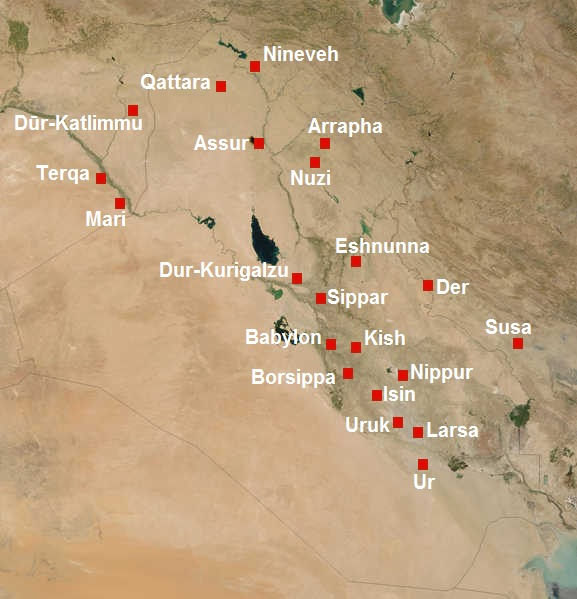
Locations of some major Mesopotamian cities

It is probable that Nabopolassar held some high office in Uruk before his rebellion against Assyria, possibly following the family tradition and serving as the city's governor. In early 626 BC, he rose in rebellion against Sinsharishkun. Fighting for the control of Babylonia would drag on for about ten years, and which side had the advantage shifted dramatically back and forth several times.

The timing of the revolt was opportune. Nabopolassar might have used the political instability caused by the revolt of Sin-shumu-lishir a few months prior, as well as the unrest caused by the potentially ongoing interregnum in the south, to his advantage. He began by assaulting both Babylon and Nippur, taking the cities from the garrisons left there by Sinsharishkun. The Assyrian response was swift and in October 626 BC, the Assyrian army recaptured Nippur and laid siege to both Nabopolassar at Uruk and to Babylon itself. Both sieges were repulsed by Nabopolassar's forces; the siege of Babylon would be the last time an Assyrian army attempted to take the city.

In the aftermath of the failed Assyrian counterattack, Nabopolassar was formally crowned king of Babylon on 22/23 November 626 BC, restoring Babylonia as an independent kingdom. In 625–623 BC, Sinsharishkun's forces again attempted to defeat Nabopolassar, campaigning in northern Babylonia. Initially, these campaigns were successful; in 625 BC the Assyrians took the city of Sippar and Nabopolassar's attempted reconquest of Nippur failed. Another of Assyria's vassals, Elam, also stopped paying tribute to Assyria during this time and several Babylonian cities, such as Der, revolted and joined Nabopolassar. Realizing the threat this posed, Sinsharishkun led a massive counterattack himself which saw the successful recapture of Uruk in 623 BC.

Sinsharishkun might have ultimately been victorious had it not been for another revolt, led by an Assyrian general in the empire's western provinces in 622 BC. This general, whose name remains unknown, took advantage of the absence of Sinsharishkun and the Assyrian army to march on Nineveh, the Assyrian capital, where he met a hastily organized army which surrendered without fighting. The usurper then successfully seized the Assyrian throne. The surrender of the army indicates that the usurper was an Assyrian and possibly even a member of the royal family, or at least a person that would be acceptable as king. Understandably alarmed by this development, Sinsharishkun abandoned his Babylonian campaign and though he successfully defeated the usurper after a hundred days of civil war, the absence of the Assyrian army saw the Babylonians conquer the last remaining Assyrian outposts in Babylonia in 622–620 BC. The Babylonian siege of Uruk had begun by October 622 BC and though control of the ancient city would shift between Assyria and Babylon, it was firmly in Nabopolassar's hands by 620 BC. Nippur was also conquered in 620 BC and Nabopolassar pushed the Assyrians out of Babylonia. Though he had successfully driven out the Assyrian army, pro-Assyrian factions still existed in some Babylonian cities, for instance Ur and Nippur, by 617 BC, making Nabopolassar's full consolidation of control in the south slow. The fighting in Babylonia in the last stages of the localized conflict turned conditions so desperate in some places that parents sold their children into slavery to avoid them starving to death.

=== Early campaigns into Assyria ===
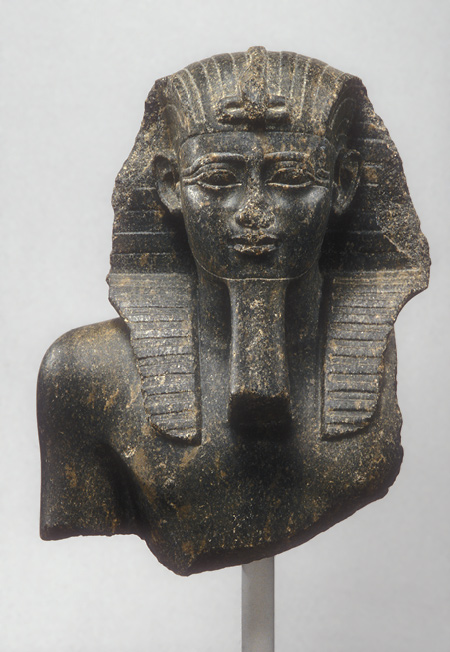
Bust of Pharaoh Psamtik I of Egypt, an Assyrian ally who aided the Assyrians against the Babylonians

While unlikely to have been received positively, the end of Assyrian rule in Babylonia would probably not have been regarded as significant to the Assyrians at the time. All fighting had happened in Babylonia and the outcome was not yet decisive, characteristic of previous Assyro-Babylonian conflicts in the Neo-Assyrian period. In previous uprisings, the Babylonians had sometimes temporarily gained the upper hand as well and there was no reason to believe that Nabopolassar's success would be anything but a temporary inconvenience.

In 616 BC, Nabopolassar entered Assyrian territory for the first time, leading his armies along the Euphrates river into lands in present-day Syria. As he marched on, he took the Assyrian city Hindanu and reached the Balikh River, where he defeated an Assyrian force near the city Gablinu. Nabpolassar then pushed north, reaching as far as the Khabur River. The Assyrians swiftly regrouped in order to deal with the threat. Realizing that the situation was dire, Assyria's ally, Pharaoh Psamtik I of Egypt, marched his troops to aid Sinsharishkun. Psamtik had over the last few years campaigned to establish dominance over the small city-states of the Levant and it was in his interests that Assyria survived as a buffer state between his own empire and those of the Babylonians and Medes in the east. A joint Egyptian-Assyrian campaign to capture the city of Gablinu was undertaken in October of 616 BC, but ended in failure after which the Egyptian allies kept to the west of the Euphrates, only offering limited support. Both the Assyrians and the Babylonians then withdrew, though the Babylonians retained Hindanu and now controlled the middle Euphrates, a major strategical victory and probably the first step in Nabopolassar's plan to counteract the possibility of an Assyrian invasion of Babylonia. That Nabopolassar withdrew at the same time as the Assyrians did suggests that the Babylonians were not yet ready to conduct a full invasion of Assyria and that their plans were at this time just to secure Babylonian independence, not to conquer and destroy Assyria.

In March 615 BC, Nabopolassar inflicted a crushing defeat on the Assyrian army at the banks of the Tigris, pushing them back to the Little Zab. This victory weakened Assyrian control of the buffer zone that had been established around the middle of the Tigris river between the two kingdoms, meaning that the Babylonians now controlled lands directly bordering the Assyrian heartland itself.

=== Fall of Assyria ===
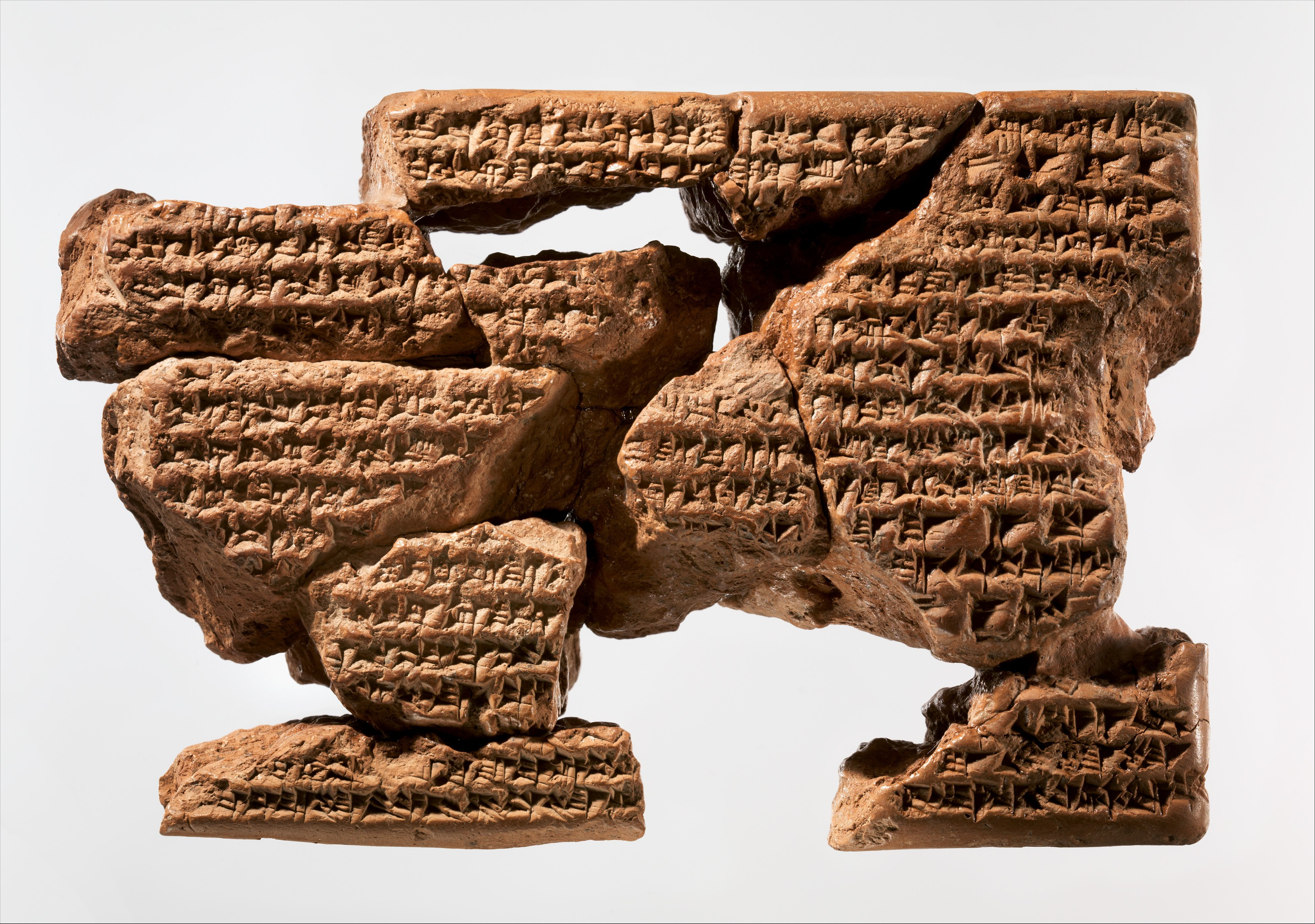
Letter from Sinsharishkun to Nabopolassar (c. 613 BC) wherein Sinsharishkun attempts to broker peace, pleading to be allowed to retain his kingdom. The authenticity of the letter is a matter of debate.

In May 615 BC, Nabopolassar and the Babylonians assaulted Assur, the ceremonial and religious center of Assyria and the Assyrian Empire's southernmost remaining city. Sinsharishkun swiftly rallied his army and counterattacked, lifting the siege of Assur and forcing Nabopolassar to retreat to the city of Takrit. There, Sinsharishkun besieged Nabopolassar, but he was eventually forced to abandon the siege. Though the conflict had shifted to Assyria becoming the defender, the war was at this point still being fought according to standard Mesopotamian practice, with attacks, counterattacks and retreats and neither side having the confidence or means to force a decisive confrontation. Despite constant defeats and setbacks, the Assyrian army remained powerful and capable of being deployed rapidly.

In late 615 BC or in 614 BC, the Medes under their king Cyaxares entered Assyria and conquered the region around the city of Arrapḫa in preparation for a campaign against Sinsharishkun. Although there are plenty of earlier sources discussing Assyro-Median relations, none are preserved from the period leading up to Cyaxares's invasion and as such, the political context and reasons for the sudden attack are not known. Perhaps, the war between Babylonia and Assyria had disrupted the economy of the Medes and inspired a direct intervention.

In July or August of 614 BC, the Medes mounted attacks on the cities of Nimrud and Nineveh and successfully conquered the city of Tarbiṣu. They then besieged Assur. This siege was successful and the Medes captured the ancient heart of Assyria, plundering it and killing many of its inhabitants. The brutal sack of Assur came as a shock to people throughout the Near East. Even the Babylonian chronicles, hostile to Assyria, speak of the Medes as unnecessarily brutal, stating that they "inflicted a terrible defeat on a great people, pillaged and looted them and robbed them". Nabopolassar only arrived at Assur after the plunder had already begun and met with Cyaxares, allying with him and signing an anti-Assyrian pact. The treaty between the Babylonians and Medes was sealed through the marriage of Nabopolassar's son and heir, Nebuchadnezzar, and Cyaxares's daughter, Amytis. The onset of winter after the fall of Assur meant that both the Medes and Babylonians then returned to their homelands, preparing for further campaigns in the next year. The Assyrians appear to have not recognized the severity of their situation as they did not use the pause in the fighting to fall back into, and prepare, defensive positions. Instead of repairing the damage in Nimrud, the populace there dismantled the walls further to prepare for future renovation work (which would never happen).

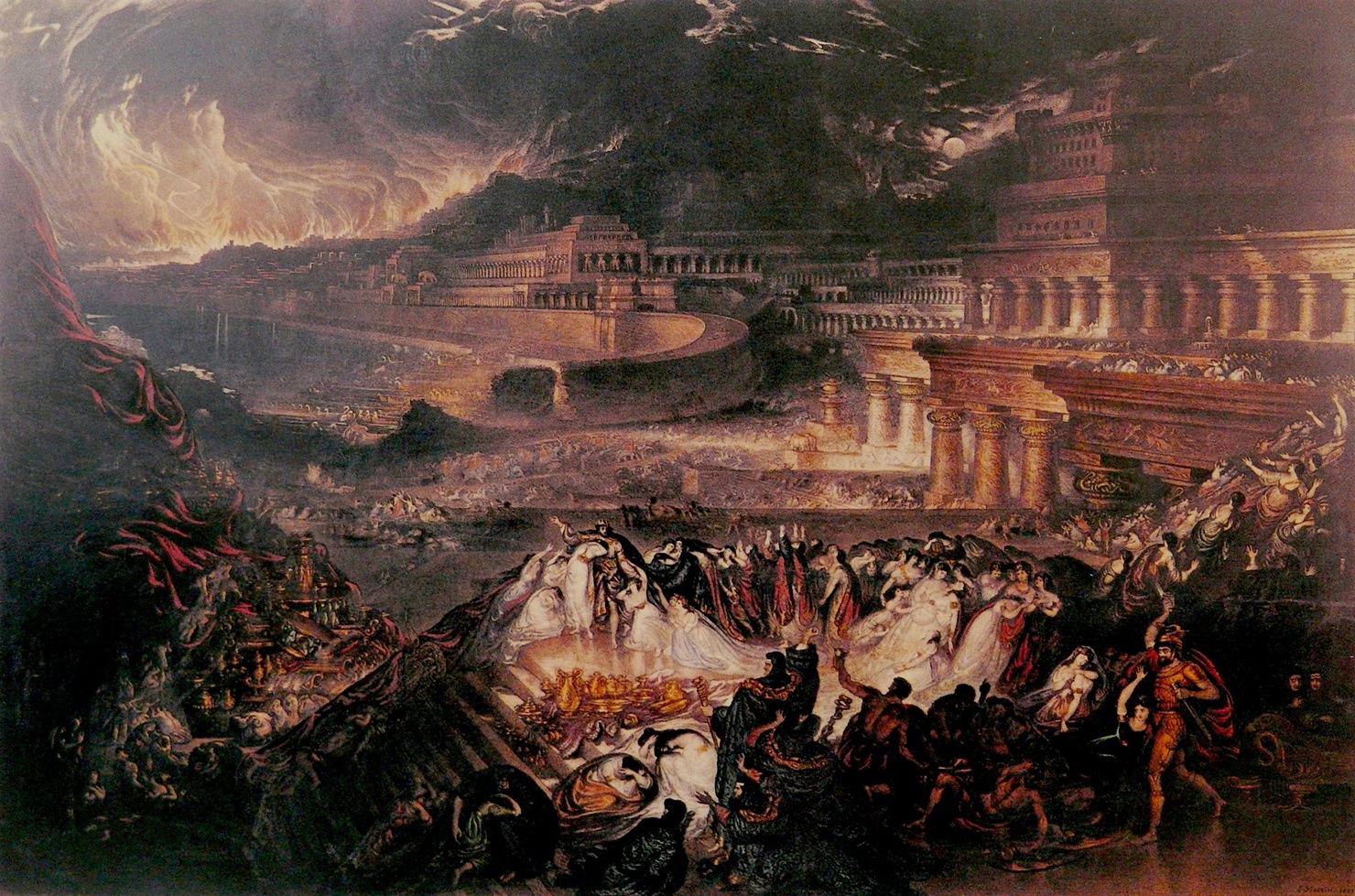
Fall of Nineveh by John Martin (1829)

In an attempt to keep the enemies out of Assyria, Sinsharishkun went on the offensive in 613 BC, attacking Nabopolassar's forces in the middle Euphrates, occupied at the time with suppressing an Assyrian-supported rebellion of a local tribe. Sinshariskun successfully rescued the tribe's besieged city of Rahilu, but Nabopolassar's army retreated before a battle could take place. Around this time, Sinsharishkun, apparently finally recognizing the disaster that was about to befall his kingdom, sent a letter to Nabopolassar, attempting to broker peace. Sinsharishkun pleaded with Nabopolassar to avoid any more bloodshed and wrote that he should "quiet his fiery heart". Nabopolassar was not interested; Sinsharishkun had waited too long and there was no longer anything he could offer that the Babylonians and Medes would not be able to take for themselves in battle. A harsh response was sent, in which Nabopolassar declared that "[Nineveh's] roots I shall pluck out and the foundations of the land I shall obliterate". The original tablets containing these letters have not been preserved, with the known text instead having been derived from tablets made during Seleucid times, centuries later. Whether the letters are copies of authentic, more ancient, originals, or fabrications entirely is a matter of debate.

In April or May 612 BC, at the start of Nabopolassar's fourteenth year as king of Babylon, the combined Medo-Babylonian army marched on Nineveh. Sinsharishkun rallied his forces to make a final stand at the capital but stood little chance at defending it on account of the city's massive size. From June to August 612 BC, the Medo-Babylonian army besieged the Assyrian capital and in August the walls were breached, leading to a lengthy and brutal sack. The city was looted, depictions of the Assyrian kings were mutilated and inhabitants as young as the age of ten were slaughtered en masse before the entire city was razed and burned to the ground. Sinsharishkun's fate is not entirely certain but it is commonly accepted that he died in the defense of Nineveh.

The brutal sack of Nineveh was only the beginning; in the aftermath of their victory, the Medes swept through the Assyrian heartland. Cities such as Nimrud, Dur-Sharrukin, Tarbiṣu, Imgur-Enlil and Khirbet Khatuniyeh were completely destroyed, with only a handful of sites, such as Assur and Arbela, continuing to be populated under later Babylonian and Median rule. The level of the destruction, including the destruction and desecration of Assyria's temples, shocked the Babylonians and Nabopolassar. In some inscriptions, Nabopolassar was careful to attribute his victory and its aftermath to divine intervention in attempt to absolve himself of the blame, though other inscriptions were less remorseful, with one reading "I slaughtered the land of Assyria, I turned the hostile land into heaps and ruins". Later Neo-Babylonian rulers, such as Nabonidus (r. 556–539 BC), blamed the destruction solely on the Medes and Cyaxares, maintaining that Nabopolassar had not destroyed any temples and described him as remorseful of the fate that befell Assyria. Though ultimately victorious, the Babylonians and Medes had violated the normal practices of warfare in the Near East. The destruction of the Assyrian heartland had been so extensive that the region did not even begin to recover until a century later, when it came under the rule of the Achaemenid Empire. Although Nabopolassar did not take the title "king of Assyria", he first extracted tribute while encamped at the ruins of Nineveh. In 2003, Assyriologist Stephanie Dalley wrote that two of the modern interpretations in regards to the reason for briefly "ruling" from Nineveh are that Nabopolassar either might have wanted to cement himself as the successor of the Assyrian kings, or that taking residence there was an attempt to save what remained of the city from further sacking by the Medes.

=== Ashur-uballit II and the Egyptians ===
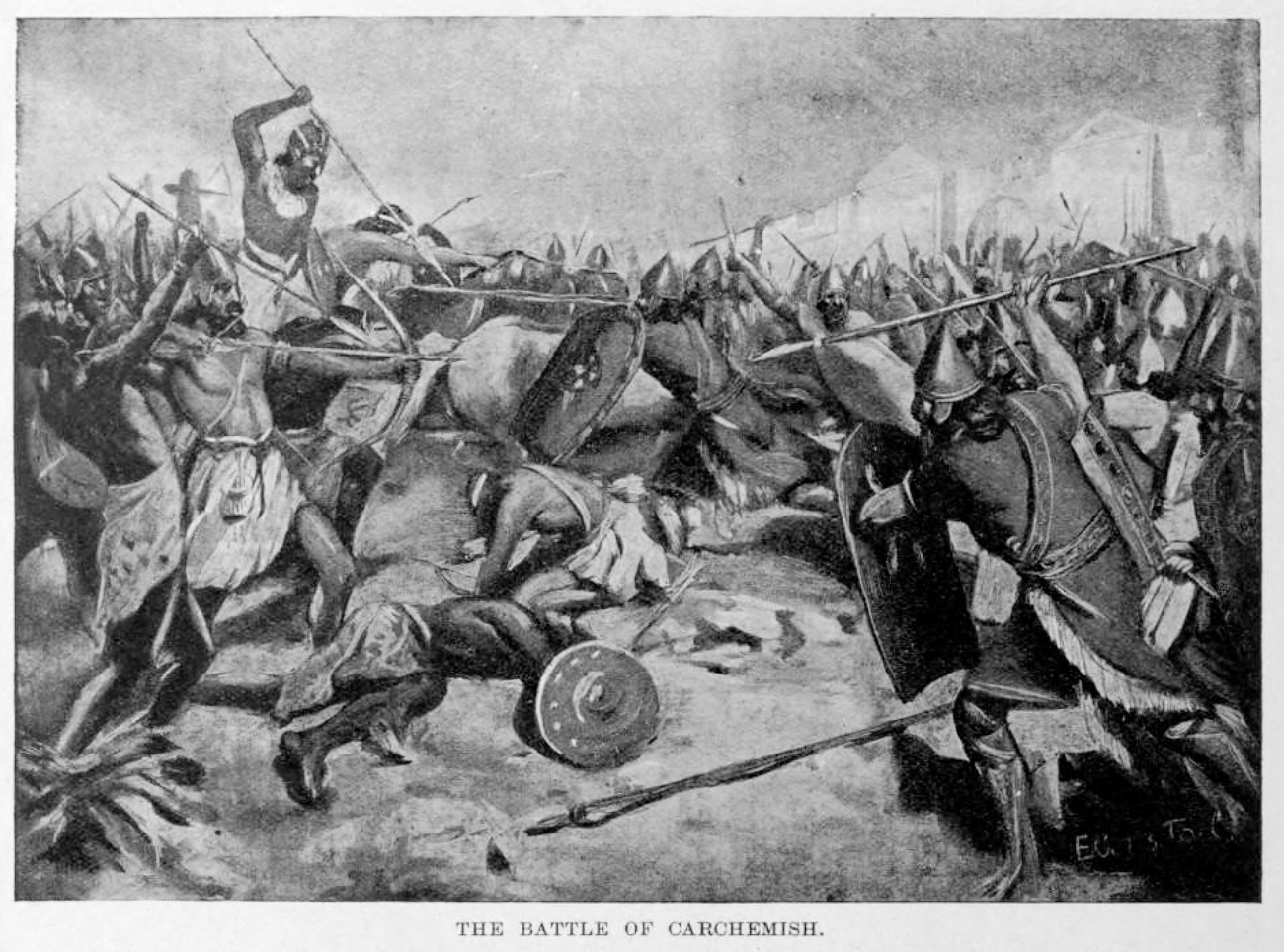
The Battle of Carchemish, as depicted in Hutchinson's Story of the Nations (1900)

The survivors of Nineveh's fall followed a new Assyrian ruler, Ashur-uballit II, possibly Sinsharishkun's son, to the city of Harran, where they continued to hold out. Although Babylonian sources refer to him as Assyria's new king, Ashur-uballit ruled with the title of crown prince (mar šarri, literally meaning "son of the king"). In Assyrian tradition, the king was appointed to his position by the Assyrian national deity, Ashur, during the New Year festivals in Assur. The last king to be crowned at the temple of Ashur at Assur had been Sinsharishkun and with the city's destruction in 614 BC, the traditional Assyrian coronation ritual was now impossible. Ashur-uballit did have a coronation ceremony in late 612 BC, but instead of conducting it in Assur, it was conducted in the temple of the moon god Sin, another important deity in the empire, at Harran. That he was not formally king does not mean that his claim was challenged by his subjects; like the coronation of a king, the appointment of a crown prince required the formal recognition of all subjects and of the gods. Should the king be unable to exercise his duties, the crown prince was a competent substitute, exercising similar legal and political power. Ashur-uballit was the recognized legitimate ruler, and his title was only a provisional arrangement until he could undergo the proper coronation.

In 611 BC, Nabopolassar's army consolidated his rule throughout northern Mesopotamia, going as far as to the border of Harran itself. After Nabopolassar himself had travelled the recently conquered Assyrian heartland in 610 BC in order to ensure stability, the Medo-Babylonian army embarked on a campaign against Harran in November of 610 BC. Intimidated by the approach of the Medo-Babylonian army, Ashur-uballit and a contingent of Egyptian reinforcements fled the city into the deserts of Syria. The siege of Harran lasted from the winter of 610 BC to the beginning of 609 BC and the city eventually capitulated. Ashur-uballit's failure at Harran marks the end for the ancient Assyrian monarchy, which would never be restored. After the Babylonians had ruled Harran for three months, Ashur-uballit and a large force of Egyptian soldiers attempted to retake the city, but this campaign failed disastrously. Beginning in July or June 609 BC, Ashur-uballit's siege lasted for two months, until August or September, but he and the Egyptians retreated when Nabopolassar again led his army against them. It is possible that they had retreated even earlier. The failed retaking of Harran is the last time Ashur-uballit is mentioned in Babylonian records; his ultimate fate is unknown.

After his victory at Harran, Nabopolassar resumed his campaign against the remainder of the Assyrian army in the beginning of the year 608 or 607 BC. In 608 BC the Egyptian Pharaoh Necho II, Psamtik I's successor, personally led a large Egyptian army into former Assyrian territory to rescue what remained of the Assyrians and turn the tide of the war. Though Necho would spend the better part of three years attempting to defeat the Babylonians, the Assyrian Empire had already collapsed and he was fighting for a lost cause.

At Megiddo, Necho easily defeated the king of Judah, Josiah, who had attempted to block his advance into Syria and Mesopotamia. The reason for Josiah deciding to attempt to halt the Egyptian campaign is not known, but he might have been inspired by the Egyptian failure to aid the Assyrians in holding and then recapturing Harran for the Assyrians. According to the Biblical Books of Chronicles, Necho had not intended to do battle with the Judeans and was confused by Josiah's decision to attack him, supposedly sending a letter to him which included the passage "what have we done to each other, king of Judah? I am not coming against you this day."

For much of the period between 609 and 607 BC, Nabopolassar was occupied by a war against the northern Kingdom of Urartu, and in the meantime, the Egyptians took the city of Carchemish in Syria, which Necho established as his base of operations for the course of the campaign. In 606 BC, the Egyptians won several victories at various sites in Syria, such as at the city of Kimuhu, located near Carchemish. The Egyptian war continued until Necho suffered a crushing defeat at the Battle of Carchemish in 605 BC. According to the Babylonian records of the battle and its aftermath, "not a single man escaped to his country"; Necho's forces were completely annihilated. The Babylonian forces at the battle were led by Nabopolassar's son and crown prince, Nebuchadnezzar, as Nabopolassar had chosen to stay in Babylon, possibly on account of illness.

=== Nabopolassar victorious ===
Political maps of the Ancient Near East in 700 BC (top) and 600 BC (bottom)

With the war against Egypt over, and twenty years of near-constant warfare concluded, Nabopolassar stood victorious, having achieved all of his objectives. Nineveh no longer existed and Assyria would never rise again. The Egyptians no longer represented a threat and the only other major power in the Near East, the Medes, were Nabopolassar's allies. Through the defeat of all of Nabopolassar's rivals, his Neo-Babylonian Empire had become the uncontested successor of the Neo-Assyrian Empire. For the first time since the Assyrian conquest more than a century prior, tribute flowed into Babylonia rather than being drained from it.

Because Nabopolassar had spent virtually his entire reign at war, pressing affairs in his capital, Babylon, had been more or less neglected. The city had been destroyed by the Neo-Assyrian king Sennacherib in 689 BC, and though it was rebuilt by Sennacherib's successor Esarhaddon, it was not rebuilt as the capital of an empire, lacking the necessary headquarters for efficient imperial administration and with religious institutions not as elaborate of those that existed in Assyria. Though early work had been begun by Nabopolassar, much work still lay ahead; a new wall had to be built around the city and the great temples of Babylon, most importantly the Esagila, had to be restored.

It was with this work still ahead of him, on the eve of his final victory, that Nabopolassar died. As he had managed to secure universal recognition for his rule, Nabopolassar was succeeded without any issues by his son and crown prince Nebuchadnezzar, who would finish the building projects left at the time of Nabopolassar's death and, in time, surpass his father. At the time of Nabopolassar's death, Nebuchadnezzar was still away on campaign and upon hearing the news, he quickly arranged affairs with the Egyptians and rushed back to Babylon. The speed in which Nebuchadnezzar returned to Babylon might be because of the threat of one of his brothers (two are known by name: Nabu-shum-lishir and Nabu-zer-ushabshi) potentially attempting to claim the throne. Though Nebuchadnezzar had been recognized as the eldest son and heir by Nabopolassar, Nabu-shum-lishir had been recognized as "his equal brother", a dangerously vague title. No attempts at usurpation were made. One of Nebuchadnezzar's first acts as king was to bury his father. Nabopolassar was laid in a huge coffin, adorned with ornamented gold plates and fine dresses with golden beads, which was then placed within a small palace he had constructed in Babylon.

== Legacy ==
With the rise of Nabopolassar and the foundation of the Neo-Babylonian Empire, Babylonia entered into a new age of political stability and economic prosperity. In terms of his legacy, archaeologist and historian Rocío Da Riva wrote in 2017 that Nabopolassar's exploits and figure are "inextricably linked to the overthrow of the Neo-Assyrian Empire and to the formation and configuration of the Chaldean kingdom".

Nabopolassar's legend survived for centuries and he was long remembered by the Babylonians as the "avenger of Akkad" (i. e. Babylonia) and as a symbol of resistance to domination of foreign empires. Several later texts hold that Nabopolassar was even divinely ordered by Marduk, Babylon's chief deity, to avenge Babylonia. During the Hellenistic period, centuries after Nabopolassar's death and the eventual collapse of his empire, Babylonian authors used historical royal figures as the subjects of epics and stories to avoid explicit commentary on their contemporary politics. Typically, these historical figures were ancient, and more recent, Assyrian and Babylonian kings, including those of the Neo-Babylonian Empire. Nabopolassar, called Belesys or Bupolasaros by the Hellenistic-era authors, is used in some and is generally cast in a very positive light, described as a pious and just king who, partly through reverence of Marduk, managed to liberate his homeland from the rule of the Assyrian Empire. The antagonist of the Nabopolassar epics is typically Sinsharishkun or Sin-shumu-lishir (who was actually defeated by Sinsharishkun, not Nabopolassar). Texts and chronicles describing Nabopolassar's military career were being spread throughout Babylonia in the 5th, and probably also 4th, century BC.

A rare negative portrayal of Nabopolassar has been recovered in a Seleucid-era colophon, which erroneously identifies Nabopolassar as a "king of the Sealand" (the Sealand being the southernmost part of Babylonia, often politically independent or autonomous) and accuses the king of having stolen wooden tablets from temples in Uruk. The contemporary priest of Uruk, Kidin-Ani, alleged that he had seen these tablets on a visit to Elam in the reign of either Seleucus I (r. 305–281 BC) or Antiochus I (r. 281–261 BC). Though the entire story has to be seen as unreliable, it is possible that this particular tale can be related to a passage in the Babylonian chronicles that mention Nabopolassar returning statues of gods to that the Assyrians had stolen from Elam and put in Uruk.

== Titles ==
Some aspects of Nabopolassar's royal titulature suggest that he wished to distance himself from the Neo-Assyrian kings, while others suggest the opposite and a wish to establish clear continuity with them. Some prominent Assyrian titles, such as "king of the Four Corners of the World", were dropped, whereas Nabopolassar assumed others, such as šarru dannu ("mighty king") and the much older Sumerian "king of Sumer and Akkad". The title of "mighty king" in particular was strongly associated with Assyria, previously only ever having been used by Assyrian rulers. Though the title was not used in any royal inscriptions, i. e. not "officially", both Nabopolassar and his heir Nebuchadnezzar used the ancient title "king of the Universe" in economical documents.

Nabopolassar not fully being disconnected from his Assyrian predecessors in his titulature is also reflected in his empire's administrative structure, which essentially was the same as that of the Neo-Assyrian Empire. That titulature and administration did not change much from Sinsharishkun to Nabopolassar is hardly surprising as virtually the entirety of Nabopolassar's reign was spent fighting wars, with little time to devote to other matters. With Nabopolassar's use of titles in mind, and the fact that little changed administratively from the Neo-Assyrians to the Neo-Babylonians, it is possible that Nabopolassar represented himself as the legitimate heir to the throne of the Assyrians. Later Babylonian king lists do not clearly separate the Neo-Assyrian and Neo-Babylonian dynasties in the same way that modern scholars do.

In one of his clay cylinders, Nabopolassar used the titulature presented below. The use of "governor of Babylon" (šakkanakki Bābili) rather than "king of Babylon" (šar Bābili) was an ancient practice of the Babylonian monarchs and an act of reverence to Marduk, who was formally considered the true king of Babylon. In Nabopolassar's inscriptions the usage varied and there are examples where he used "king of Babylon" instead.

Nabopolassar, governor of Babylon, king of Sumer and Akkad, the lofty prince, who is under the guidance of Nabu and Marduk, the humble, the submissive, whose heart has learned the fear of god and goddess, the restorer of Esagila and Ezida, the one who looks after the rights of the great gods.

Nabopolassar Chaldean dynasty Born: 658 BC Died: 605 BC
Preceded by Sinsharishkun	King of Babylon; 626 – 605 BC	Succeeded by Nebuchadnezzar II
