= Necho II =

Egyptian pharaoh

- Nekau
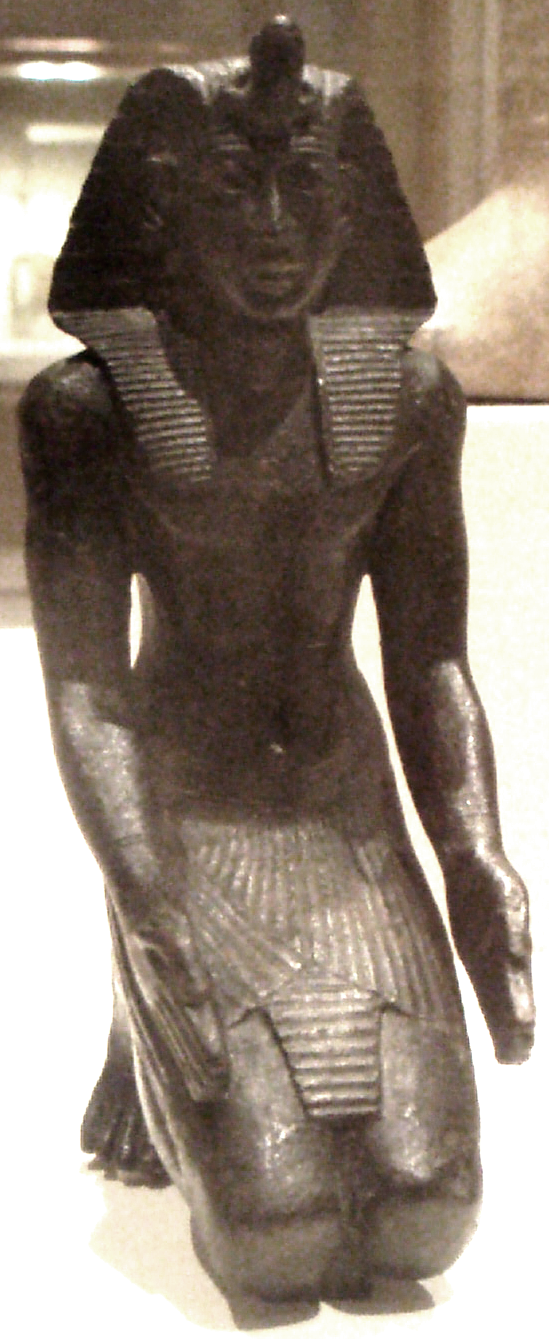
- A small kneeling bronze statuette, likely Necho II, now residing in the Brooklyn Museum

Pharaoh
- Reign: 610–595 BC
- Predecessor: Psamtik I
- Successor: Psamtik II
Royal titulary
Horus name
Siaib
Sjꜣ-jb
G5	S32 ib
Nebty name
Maakheru
Mꜣꜥ-ḫrw
G16	G16 mAa xrw
Golden Horus
Merynetjeru
Mrj-nṯrw
G8	R8 R8 R8 mr
Prenomen
Wahemibre
Wḥm-jb-Rꜥ

M23 X1 L2 X1	ra wHm ib
Nomen
Necho
N-kꜣw

G39 N5	n E1 w
- Consort: Khedebneithirbinet I
- Children: Psamtik II
- Father: Psamtik I
- Mother: Mehtenweskhet
- Died: 595 BC
- Dynasty: 26th dynasty

Necho II (sometimes Nekau, Neku, Nechoh, or Nikuu; Greek: Νεκώς Β'; Hebrew: נְכוֹ, Modern: Neḵō, Tiberian: Nəḵō) of Egypt was a king of the 26th Dynasty (610–595 BC), which ruled from Sais. Necho undertook a number of construction projects across his kingdom. In his reign, according to the Greek historian Herodotus, Necho II sent out an expedition of Phoenicians, which in three years sailed from the Red Sea around Africa to the Strait of Gibraltar and back to Egypt. His son, Psammetichus II, upon succession may have removed Necho's name from monuments.

Necho played a significant role in the histories of the Neo-Assyrian Empire, the Neo-Babylonian Empire and the Kingdom of Judah. Necho II killed Josiah, and replaced Josiah's chosen successor with his own nominee. The aim of the second of Necho's campaigns was Asiatic conquest, to contain the westward advance of the Neo-Babylonian Empire, and cut off its trade route across the Euphrates. However, the Egyptians were defeated by the unexpected attack of the Babylonians and were eventually expelled from Syria.

The Egyptologist Donald B. Redford observed that Necho II was "a man of action from the start, and endowed with an imagination perhaps beyond that of his contemporaries, [who] had the misfortune to foster the impression of being a failure."

== Biography ==
=== Lineage and early life ===
Necho II was the son of Psammetichus I by his Great Royal Wife Mehtenweskhet. His prenomen or royal name Wahem-Ib-Re means "Carrying out [the] Heart (i.e., Wish) [of] Re." Upon his ascension, Necho was faced with the chaos created by the raids of the Cimmerians and the Scythians, who had not only ravaged Asia west of the Euphrates, but had also helped the Babylonians shatter the Assyrian Empire. That once mighty empire was now reduced to the troops, officials, and nobles who had gathered around a general holding out at Harran, who had taken the throne name of Ashur-uballit II. Necho attempted to assist this remnant immediately upon his coronation, but the force he sent proved to be too small, and the combined armies were forced to retreat west across the Euphrates.

=== Military campaigns ===
==== First campaign ====
In the spring of 609 BC, Necho personally led a sizable force to help the Assyrians. At the head of a large army, consisting mainly of his mercenaries, Necho took the coast route Via Maris into Syria, supported by his Mediterranean fleet along the shore, and proceeded through the low tracts of Philistia and Sharon. At Megiddo (according to 2 Kings 23) he engaged the Judean king, Josiah, and had the Judean king killed (an alternative version, in 2 Chronicles 35, of a battle in Megiddo also exists.)

Herodotus reports the campaign of the pharaoh in his Histories, Book 2:159:

Necos, then, stopped work on the canal and turned to war; some of his triremes were constructed by the northern sea, and some in the Arabian Gulf (Red Sea), by the coast of the Sea of Erythrias. The windlasses for beaching the ships can still be seen. He deployed these ships as needed, while he also engaged in a pitched battle at Magdolos with the Syrians, and conquered them; and after this he took Cadytis (Kadesh), which is a great city of Syria. He sent the clothes he had worn in these battles to the Branchidae of Miletus and dedicated them to Apollo.

Necho soon captured Kadesh on the Orontes and moved forward, joining forces with Ashur-uballit and together they crossed the Euphrates and laid siege to Harran. Although Necho became the first pharaoh to cross the Euphrates since Thutmose III, he failed to capture Harran, and retreated back to northern Syria. At this point, Ashur-uballit vanished from history, and the Assyrian Empire was conquered by the Babylonians.

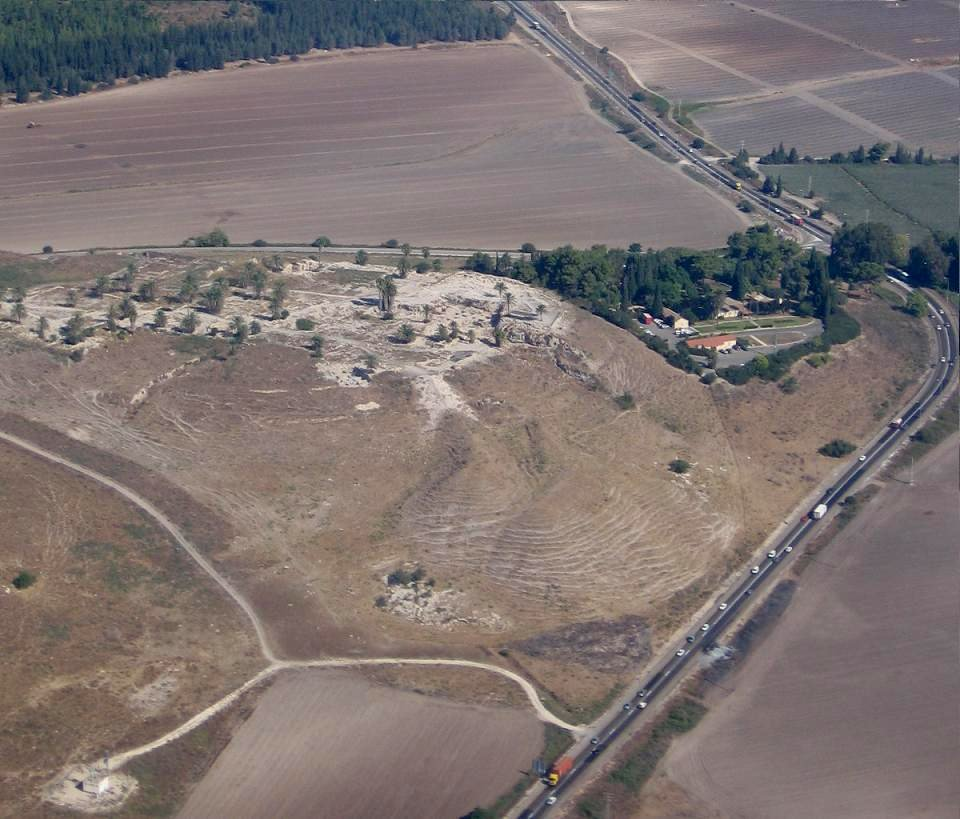
Aerial view of Tel Megiddo site of the battle of Megiddo in 609 BC

Leaving a sizable force behind, Necho returned to Egypt. On his return march, he found that the Judeans had selected Jehoahaz to succeed his father Josiah, whom Necho deposed and replaced with Jehoiakim. He brought Jehoahaz back to Egypt as his prisoner, where Jehoahaz ended his days (2 Kings 23:31–34; 2 Chronicles 36:1–4).

==== Second campaign ====
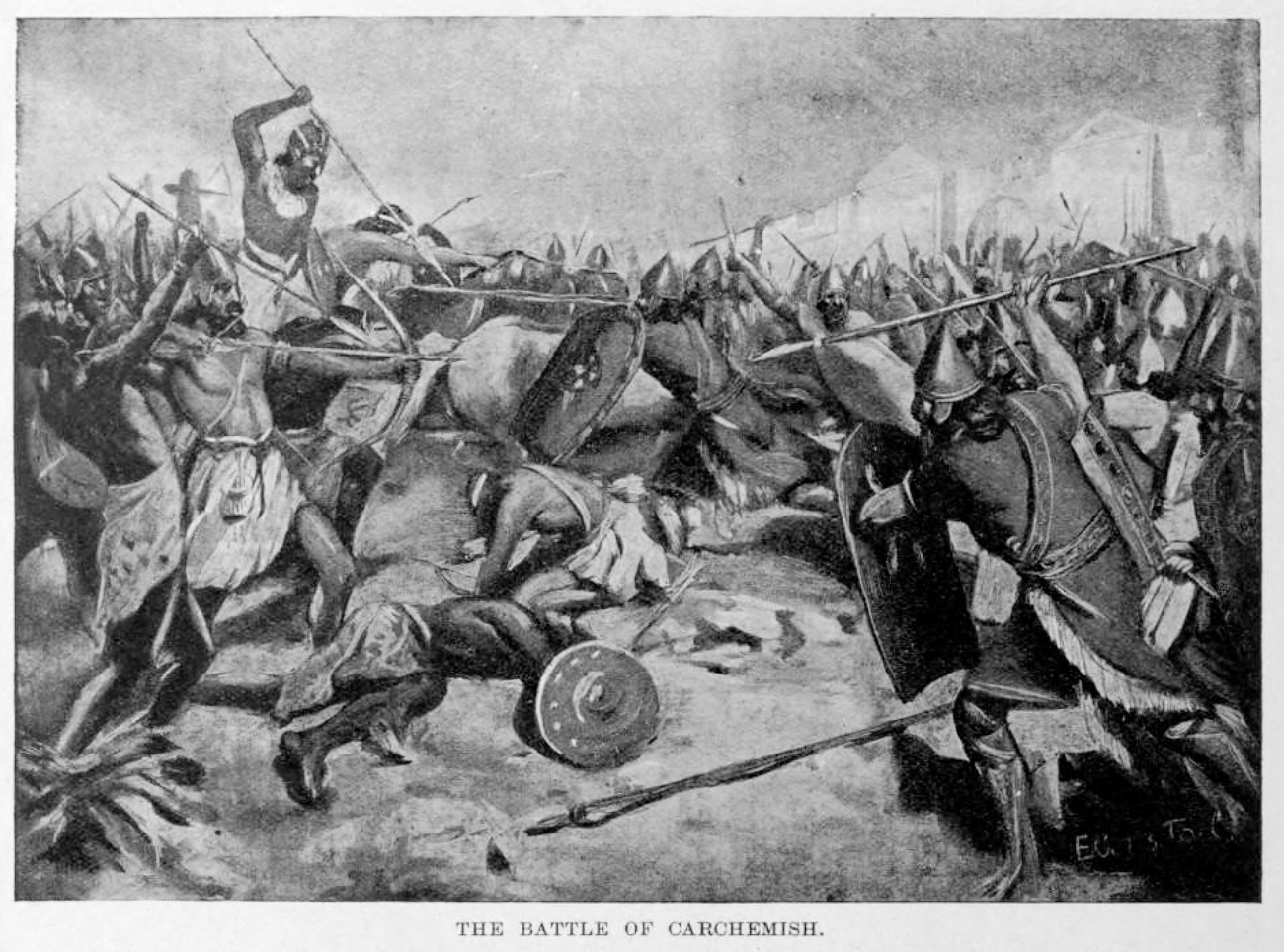
In 605 BC, an Egyptian force fought the Babylonians at Battle of Carchemish, helped by the remnants of the army of the former Assyria, but this was met with defeat.

The Babylonian king was planning on reasserting his power in Syria. In 609 BC, King Nabopolassar captured Kumukh, which cut off the Egyptian army, then based at Carchemish. Necho responded the following year by retaking Kumukh after a four-month siege, and executed the Babylonian garrison. Nabopolassar gathered another army, which camped at Qurumati on the Euphrates. However, Nabopolassar's poor health forced him to return to Babylon in 605 BC. In response, in 606 BC the Egyptians attacked the leaderless Babylonians (probably then led by the crown prince Nebuchadnezzar) who fled their position.

At this point, the aged Nabopolassar passed command of the army to his son Nebuchadnezzar II, who led them to a decisive victory over the Egyptians at Carchemish in 605 BC, and pursued the fleeing survivors to Hamath. Necho's dream of restoring the Egyptian Empire in the Middle East as had occurred under the New Kingdom was destroyed as Nebuchadnezzar conquered Egyptian territory from the Euphrates to the Brook of Egypt (Jeremiah 46:2; 2 Kings 24:7) down to Judea. Although Nebuchadnezzar spent many years in his new conquests on continuous pacification campaigns, Necho was unable to recover any significant part of his lost territories. For example, when Ashkalon rose in revolt, despite repeated pleas the Egyptians sent no help, and were barely able to repel a Babylonian attack on their eastern border in 601 BC. When he did repel the Babylonian attack, Necho managed to capture Gaza while pursuing the enemy. Necho turned his attention in his remaining years to forging relationships with new allies: the Carians, and further to the west, the Greeks.

=== Ambitious projects ===
At some point during his Syrian campaign, Necho II initiated but never completed the ambitious project of cutting a navigable canal from the Pelusiac branch of the Nile to the Red Sea. Necho's Canal was the earliest precursor of the Suez Canal. It was in connection with a new activity that Necho founded a new city of Per-Temu Tjeku which translates as 'The House of Atum of Tjeku' at the site now known as Tell el-Maskhuta, about 15 km west of Ismailia. The waterway was intended to facilitate trade between the Mediterranean Sea and the Indian Ocean.

Necho also formed an Egyptian navy by recruiting displaced Ionian Greeks. This was an unprecedented act by the pharaoh since most Egyptians had traditionally harboured an inherent distaste for and fear of the sea. The navy which Necho created operated along both the Mediterranean and Red Sea coasts. Necho II constructed warships, including questionably triremes.

=== Phoenician expedition ===
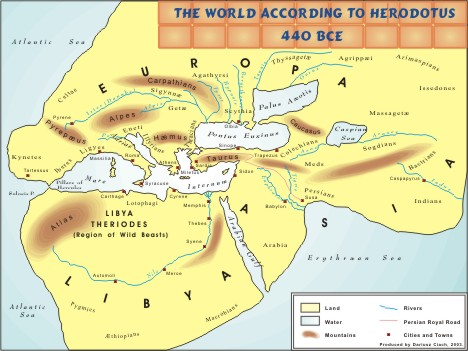
The world according to Herodotus, 440 BC

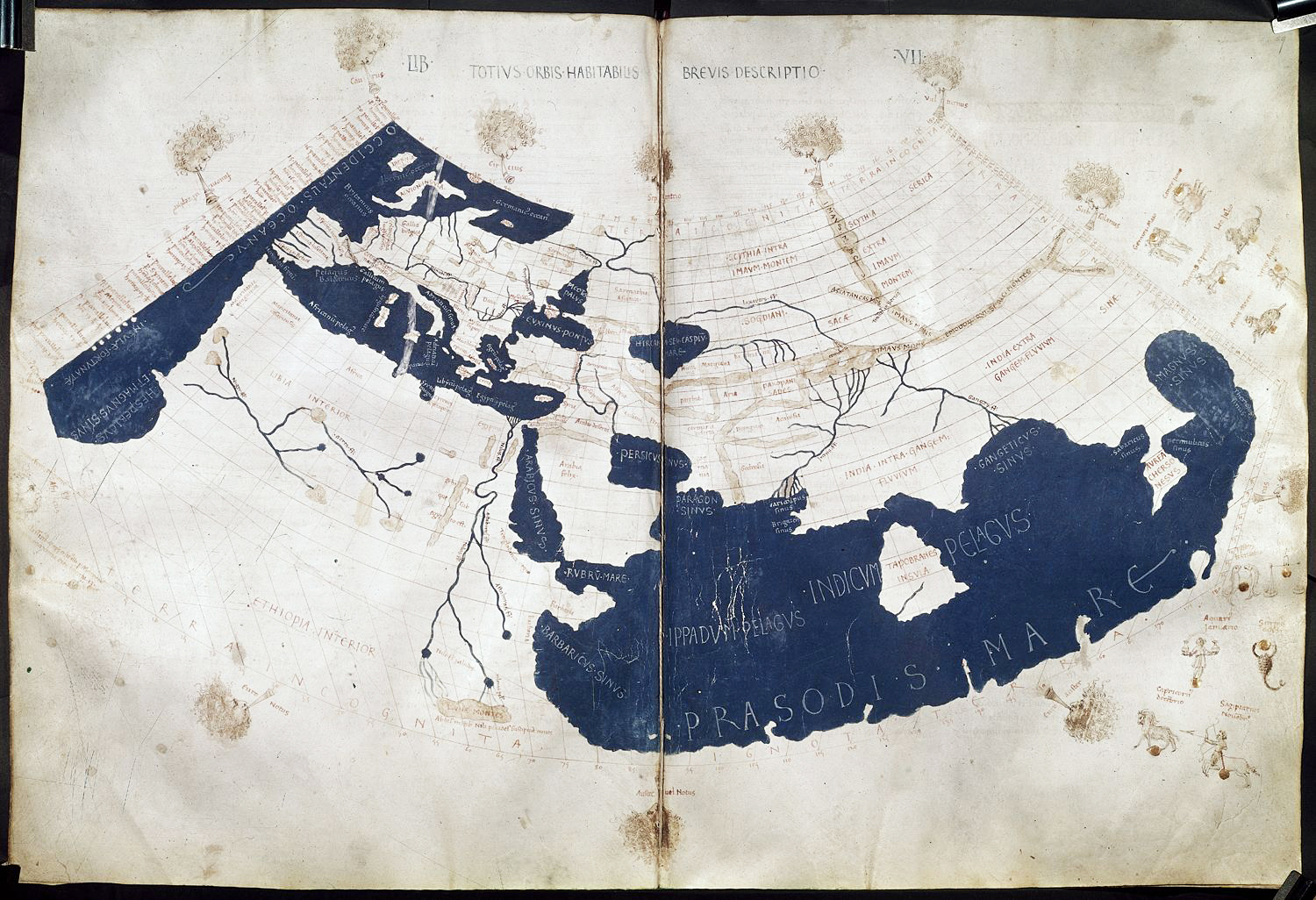
A 15th-century depiction of the Ptolemy world map, reconstituted from Ptolemy's Geographia (c. 150)

At some point between 610 and before 594 BC, Necho reputedly commissioned an expedition of Phoenicians, who it is said in three years sailed from the Red Sea around Africa back to the mouth of the Nile, stopping every Autumn to sow seeds and wait for the harvest. This would thereby be the first completion of the Cape Route. Herodotus' account was handed down to him by oral tradition, but is seen as potentially credible since he states, with disbelief, that the Phoenicians had seen the sun on their right-hand side as they made their journey round. If the Phoenicians had, in fact, circumnavigated Africa clockwise, they would have seen the sun on their right while they were South of the Equator. This doesn't necessarily prove that they completed the journey, but it does suggest that Phoenician sailors had sailed South of the Equator before and were aware of the phenomenon.

Pliny reported that Hanno had circumnavigated Africa, which may have been a conflation with Necho's voyage, while Strabo, Polybius, and Ptolemy doubted the description; at the time it was not generally known that Africa was surrounded by an ocean (with the southern part of Africa being thought connected to Asia). F. C. H. Wendel, writing in 1890, concurred with Herodotus as did James Baikie. Egyptologist A. B. Lloyd disputed in 1977 that an Egyptian Pharaoh would authorize such an expedition, except for the reasons of Asiatic conquest and trade in the ancient maritime routes. John Haywood has questioned whether the Phoenicians could have provisioned themselves how Herodotus describes, and also how they managed to get past the currents and winds on the West coast of Africa.

=== Death and succession ===
Necho II died in 595 BC and was succeeded by his son, Psamtik II, as the next pharaoh of Egypt. Psamtik II, however, apparently removed Necho's name from almost all of his father's monuments for unknown reasons. However, some scholars, such as Roberto Gozzoli, express doubt that this actually happened, arguing that the evidence for this is fragmentary and rather contradictory.

== See also ==
- Necho (crater)
- Hanno the Navigator
- List of biblical figures identified in extra-biblical sources
- Ancient Egyptian trade
- Bible and history
- Land of Punt

== External articles ==
Expedition

- Necho II's African Circumnavigation
- Ancient Egyptian economy. www.reshafim.org.il (Maritime economy)

Other

- Necho Pharaoh of Egypt. Egyptian History Archaeology and the Bible.
- Nekau (II) Wehemibre., digitalegypt.ucl.ac.uk
